= TASER X2 Defender =

Type of electroshock weapon

The Taser X2 is one of the less-lethal conducted electrical weapon (CEW) models that are used by law enforcement agencies and by civilians as a use for self-defense. It was created by TASER International, Inc. in 2011 after their popular X26 model and the similar but bulkier and heavier X3. The X2 Defender, unlike previous CEWs, can shoot two cartridges and is semi-automatic.

== Function ==
The X2 Defender is a projectile weapon that works by firing two electrically charged probes that pierce through the clothes of a target, creating neuromuscular incapacitation (NMI) of the body. The X2 can hold up to two replaceable cartridges, each holding two probes. Each "Smart Cartridge" has a circuit board that activates the cartridge to shoot out the two probes with gas pressure when it receives a signal. Unlike early CEWs, the main function of the X2 Defender does not operate under the principle of pain compliance so even people with high pain tolerance cannot resist the effects of the CEW, but if that does not work there is a backup function that enables a Drive-Stun mode in which the electric current does follow the principle of pain compliance and physically forces the target to submit. The X2 is used somewhat like a handheld pistol. They both have a similar design, and have similar features like a trigger, a safety lock, and aiming sights.

=== Safety ===
With a 600 ohm test load, the X2 Defender applies a variable voltage peaking at approximately 2000V, corresponding to a peak current of 3.3A. The widely quoted 50kV specification is an open circuit voltage and is not applied to a target in use. To ensure safe handling, the electric current only lasts a maximum of 5 seconds for every activation and the weapon can be equipped with a video camera and a data recorder. The electrical circuit is powerful enough to disrupt the sensory and motor nerves of a target, but was deemed safe by engineers associated with Taser International. General safety concerns and incidents have drawn criticism to all CEWs in use since they were made. CEWs can cause people to die in accidents where targets fall.

- Taser safety issues
- Braidwood Inquiry

== Specifications ==
The X2 has an effective range of 4.6 m (15 ft). The operating temperature range and storage temperature range is -4 °F (-20 °C) to 122 °F (50 °C). The X2 Defender’s dimensions with the battery pack (length x width x height) are 7.8″ (19.8 cm) x 1.7″ (4.3 cm) x 4.2″ (10.7 cm) and it weighs 454 grams with two full battery cartridges.

== Law enforcement use ==
The X26 and M26 models were the first advanced TASER models commonly used by law enforcement, and the X2 and X3 models came after and are increasingly being used because of their advanced semi-automatic feature. In a large metropolitan police department over a three-year study (2002–2004), the estimated success of an effective TASER incapacitation and arrest was 85 percent out of all TASER uses. Police agencies use CEWs so much because they seem to be overall safer to use while bringing a suspect into custody. The Police Executive Research Forum has found that the use of CEWs has significantly reduced suspect and officer injuries for situations where the use of force was necessary. Not all police agencies are run the same, but most of them use CEWs.

There have been many incidents that have brought major concern and criticism about police officers misusing CEWs. They were either caused by accidents that occurred while the use of force was necessary, or by police officers using CEWs at an event where it was unnecessary.

- Killing of Robert Dziekański
- University of Florida Taser incident
- UCLA Taser incident
