= Death of Igor Stachowiak =

Death of a man while in police custody in Poland

- Lying and handcuffed Igor Stachowiak being tased in a toilet room with the lights off.
- Date: May 15, 2016; 10 years ago
- Time: c. 9:10–10:24 AM CET (UTC+1)
- Location: Wrocław, Poland; 51.112344°N 17.011020°E
- Deaths: 1

Igor Stachowiak, a 25-year-old man, died 15 May 2016 while he was in the custody of the Polish police. Shortly before his death, Stachowiak had been tased three times by four law enforcement officers while lying handcuffed in a police station. Stachowiak was also tased twice during his arrest, which occurred after he was misidentified as a fugitive who had escaped police custody two days earlier.

The police officers who took part in Stachowiak's arrest initially continued to work on the force. One year after Stachowiak's death, the news channel TVN24 released a documentary about the case, leading to a nationwide debate in Poland over police brutality and the use of tasers. The increased attention to the circumstances of Stachowiak's death, which had not received broad news coverage earlier, led to the dismissal of at least eight police officers.

On 21 June 2019, the four suspected officers were convicted of abusing their positions and inflicting physical and psychological abuse upon Stachowiak. Łukasz Rz. was sentenced to two years and six months in prison, while Paweł G., Paweł P., and Adam W. were each sentenced to two years in prison. Their sentences have been served. Three of the defendants filed cassation appeals, but their cases were dismissed by the Supreme Court of Poland in 2023.

== Incident ==
=== Frontczak escapes and Stachowiak is arrested ===
On 13 May 2016, 22-year-old Mariusz Frontczak was arrested for drug possession. Frontczak escaped from the arresting officer while handcuffed. To recapture the fugitive, a dedicated team was established and all police stations in Wrocław were notified.

In the early morning of 15 May 2016, Igor Stachowiak was partying with his friends at Cherry, a nightclub near Wrocław's center. At 5:05 AM, he was ejected from the club by security guards. From there he walked to Wrocław's main square, where he continued to wander, capturing the attention of the city's camera surveillance operator. Because Stachowiak matched the description of Frontczak, the operator dispatched two police squad cars.

The first squad car, with two police officers, arrived at 6:06. The officers approached Stachowiak and talked with him for four and a half minutes, at which point another squad car arrived with two more police officers. Soon after exiting the car, one of the newly-arrived officers pulled out handcuffs. The officers attempted to arrest Stachowiak, who started struggling. The officers had difficulty handcuffing Stachowiak, so at 6:12, officer Łukasz Rz. pulled out a Taser X2 Defender from the holster attached to his belt, and after two of the other officers threw Stachowiak to the ground, he tased Stachowiak twice. Stachowiak however continued struggling, at one point kicking one of the officers in the shoulder, dislocating it. At 6:17, Stachowiak was finally placed in the police car, which then departed at 6:18.

=== Detention of witnesses ===
Stachowiak's arrest was separately recorded by three bystanders with their mobile phones. Once the police car with Stachowiak drove away, the other officers at the scene tracked down and detained the two witnesses that were closer by, who could be heard commenting on the officers' actions. Both were transported to the same police station as Stachowiak, where they were held for a day and a half. Their mobile phones were confiscated and not returned for over a month.

=== Interrogation and death ===
Stachowiak was transported to a police station at Trzemeska 12. At 6:38, he was led into the building by two police officers and placed in a detention room. The two detained witnesses, and later another man involved in an unrelated case, were subsequently placed in the same room. According to the detainees, Stachowiak was mumbling and behaving oddly. Around 6:51 an ambulance was called to the police station for the officer with a dislocated shoulder. The first responders that arrived did not come into contact with Stachowiak.

After Stachowiak was interrogated separately, the officers took him to a bathroom in order to conduct a personal search. The lights in the bathroom were off. There, at 8:57, Łukasz Rz. tased Stachowiak three times while the latter was handcuffed and lying on the floor. Around 9:10, Stachowiak was brought back to the detention room, while the other detainees were led out. Another struggle between Stachowiak and the police officers occurred, until one of the officers noticed that Stachowiak was not breathing.

At 9:18 the officers called for an ambulance, which arrived around 9:30. Stachowiak was pronounced dead at 10:24.

=== Riots ===
Stachowiak's death did not receive widespread coverage immediately afterward. After the release of TVN24's documentary brought his death to light, protests and riots took place for several days surrounding the police station where Stachowiak died. The glass in the entrance door of the police station was shattered, and the facade of the police station, several police cars, and a water cannon were damaged. Three police officers suffered minor injuries. In total, at least 40 people were detained for participation, with two men afterwards sentenced to 4.5 and 4 years of prison. Later, 24 more people were sentenced to between 6 months and 1.5 years of prison, with 13 of the sentences being suspended.

== Investigations ==
=== Autopsies ===
The first autopsy of Stachowiak's body was conducted the day after his death by medical experts from Wrocław. The experts were unable to unequivocally determine the cause of death. However, they indicated that Stachowiak's death was most likely due to three factors: having taken high doses of amphetamine, tramadol, and a synthetic cathinone; having been repeatedly tased; and having most likely been subjected to repeated pressure on the neck.

A second autopsy was conducted by specialists from the Forensic Medicine Department in Poznań, one month after Stachowiak's death. The experts found that Stachowiak had broken thyroid cartilage and bruises to the trachea. This autopsy also failed to determine the direct cause of death. It was difficult to make a reliable assessment because Stachowiak's body had already decomposed enough to obscure damage to his skin and other external injuries.

=== Initial investigation ===
Despite the presence of several surveillance cameras mounted in the building, no recordings from them were registered inside the police station on 15 May 2016. The only secured recording from them was from the outside of the station. According to Poznań's Regional Prosecutor's Office, the camera surveillance had been out of order. The recordings from the HD camera built into the Taser X2 Defender used, documenting its usage against Stachowiak, were secured on 31 May 2016.

The police conducted two internal investigations. Łukasz Rz., who had tased Stachowiak, was subject to a disciplinary proceeding and was suspended from duties for three months, after which he returned to work. The other officers who took part in Stachowiak's arrest and search in the bathroom also continued to work for the police department.

=== Nationwide response ===
On 20 May 2017, TVN24 aired a documentary by Wojciech Bojanowski about the death of Igor Stachowiak and the surrounding events, as part of its Superwizjer investigative journalism TV series, revealing the previously undisclosed recordings from the camera built into the taser. The day after the airing, the National Police Headquarters released a statement stating that the use of force, tasering, and subsequent usage of handcuffs during Stachowiak's arrest were appropriate given his behavior, and that all the circumstances surrounding the arrest were justified. Moreover, according to the statement, the officers had checked Stachowiak's identity card at the beginning of the interaction and were aware of who he was. Officers had run his name through the police database at the scene and found that he was wanted in connection with a loan-extortion investigation.

On the same day, the National Public Prosecutor's Office also released a statement, which explained that the length of the ongoing investigation of Stachowiak's death was due to the realization of motions for evidence made by Stachowiak's parents, and that for that reason it was necessary to obtain opinions of expert witnesses from a specialized forensic laboratory. The statement said that only after the opinions are obtained would it be possible to make an informed decision and bring charges against the suspects, because the evidence obtained so far allowed the investigators to presume with a high degree of probability that Stachowiak died from cardiorespiratory failure with arrhythmia after an episode of excited delirium caused by taking psychoactive drugs, as the forensic examination had shown the presence of amphetamine and tramadol.

On 26 May 2017, Tomasz Trawiński, the newly appointed Provincial Police Chief of the Lower Silesian Voivodership, announced the initiation of administrative proceedings towards dismissing five police officers of the Wrocław-Stare Miasto police station. The sixth officer who took part in the activities related to Stachowiak's arrest quit the job in the previous year. Trawiński said that the deputy that was present in the police station when Stachowiak died had been dismissed the day before his announcement, that disciplinary proceedings had been initiated against former Wrocław's police chiefs and a deputy, and in addition that a proceeding was initiated against the officer who led the investigation of Stachowiak's death. Trawiński announced that there would be an inspection of camera surveillance in Lower Silesian police units and that surveillance devices would be mounted in every place where interrogations are conducted. Trawiński said that he would keep the public up to date with the results of the proceedings.

=== Prosecution of witnesses ===
One of the two detained witnesses was fined for using profane words. The other detained witness was charged with assaulting the police officers in order to prevent them from performing their official duties. In December 2016 the investigation against the second witness was discontinued, but in 2018 the case was reopened. The Helsinki Foundation for Human Rights filed an amicus brief in the case, arguing that the recording of the arrest constituted journalism. The court acquitted the witness on 30 September 2019, having found no evidence for the crime in the recordings from the mobile phones and city surveillance cameras.

=== Criminal complaint against Bojanowski ===
A criminal complaint was brought against Bojanowski by a group of police trade unionists, accusing Bojanowski of revealing undisclosed information from a criminal proceeding. In consequence, in response to a motion by a prosecutor's office in Warsaw, a court in Warsaw exempted him from his reporter's privilege without summoning him. Bojanowski, however, successfully appealed the decision. Because Bojanowski acted in the public interest and his actions "did not cause harm, but actually [caused] benefit" the proceeding was discontinued by the prosecutor despite satisfying the criteria for the crime.

=== Sentences for the police officers ===
On 21 June 2019, the four suspected former police officers were convicted of abusing their positions and of physical and psychological abuse of Stachowiak. Łukasz Rz. was sentenced to two years and six months in prison, while Paweł G., Paweł P., and Adam W. were sentenced to two years in prison. In February 2020, the appellate court upheld the sentences, stating that Stachowiak was tortured, while also stating that his death was not caused by the actions of the officers, but by cardiorespiratory failure with arrhythmia after an episode of excited delirium caused by taking psychoactive drugs. The former officers started serving their sentences shortly before Easter of that year. In September 2020, the defenders of Łukasz Rz., Paweł G. and Adam W. filed cassation appeals to the Supreme Court of Poland. These cassation appeals were dismissed by the Supreme Court of Poland in 2023.

On 22 February 2021, the Polish Ombudsman Adam Bodnar also filed a cassation appeal, requesting a reconsideration of the case, stating that the courts "did it badly and cursorily" when assessing the responsibility of the police officers, and "minimized the blame" by not deeming the taser as the direct cause of death. In the appeal, Bodnar wrote that the court based its view on the cause of the death on only one expert opinion without investigating whether it is a good explanation in the case of a person who received electric shocks, and that the court did not take into account the opinions of other experts and witnesses that, according to Bodnar, ruled out that Stachowiak was in a state of extreme agitation. As of 2022, this cassation appeal is still pending in the Supreme Court of Poland.

== Reactions ==
In an interview for TVN24 on 21 May 2017, Bodnar said that he has "absolutely no doubt" that Igor Stachowiak was tortured and his treatment by the police officers was a "blatant violation of civil rights".

On 29 May 2017, Amnesty International sent an open letter to the Minister of the Interior and Administration Mariusz Błaszczak and the Public Prosecutor General Zbigniew Ziobro, pointing out that the length of the proceedings regarding Stachowiak's death and pointing out that an unambiguous public promise to hold the involved persons responsible was brought about only after the recordings from the police station were revealed by a TV station. On the basis of these recordings, Amnesty International ascertained that Stachowiak was subject to activities that meet the definition of torture in Article 1 of the United Nations Convention Against Torture, stating that the police officers used a taser to force confessions and humiliate Stachowiak, that they caused him physical and mental suffering in order to coerce him to a specific behavior, and moreover that using a taser against a handcuffed person was directly in contradiction to Article 25 Paragraph 3 of the Act on the Means of Physical Coercion and Firearms (Ustawa o środkach przymusu bezpośredniego i broni palnej).

In an article for Dziennik Gazeta Prawna (Daily Legal Newspaper), Patryk Słowik criticized the National Police Headquarters' statement, commenting that Article 6 of the Act on the Means of Physical Force and Firearms states that force is used in a manner that is necessary to achieve the goals, proportional to the threat level, and choosing the means that possibly cause the lowest affliction. Therefore, in Słowik's opinion, the National Police Headquarters believe that electrocuting a handcuffed man cowering in a toilet room was dictated by him endangering the four officers present in the room. Słowik further accused the police of "lying or exhibiting far-fetching ignorance" by writing that Stachowiak was wanted for an extortion of a loan, whereas in fact, according to Słowik, the police had been only trying to locate him to testify as a witness. Słowik criticized the National Public Prosecutor's Office's statement, arguing that running motions for evidence do not preclude applying precautionary measures such as suspension in duties and pretrial detention, yet bringing charges is a precondition for that, and furthermore that no legal article requires processing all evidence to bring charges against a suspect.

Łukasz Cieśla and Tomasz Pajączek from Onet.pl criticized the prosecutors and courts for basing their opinion that excited delirium was the cause of death primarily on a testimony of a team of expert witnesses who had never examined Stachowiak's body. In an interview conducted by Cieśla and Pajączek, psychiatrist and expert witness Artur de Rosier stated that excited delirium is not present in the International Classification of Diseases, that it "does not occur in science", and hence that "[he] does not use it" as an expert witness. Another interviewed psychiatrist, Piotr Gałecki, described excited delirium as a "certain hypothesis, conjecture, attempt to find an answer to the question why people sometimes die during police interventions", because "in the USA it sometimes happened that a correct use of police force resulted in death of the detainee", and that excited delirium "is a certain view, not a firm stance", and that "it is not scientifically confirmed".

== See also ==
- Killing of Robert Dziekański – 2007 police killing at Vancouver Airport
- Killing of Kelly Thomas – Man killed by police in 2011
- Death of Jordan Begley
- Taser safety issues
