= Taser safety issues =

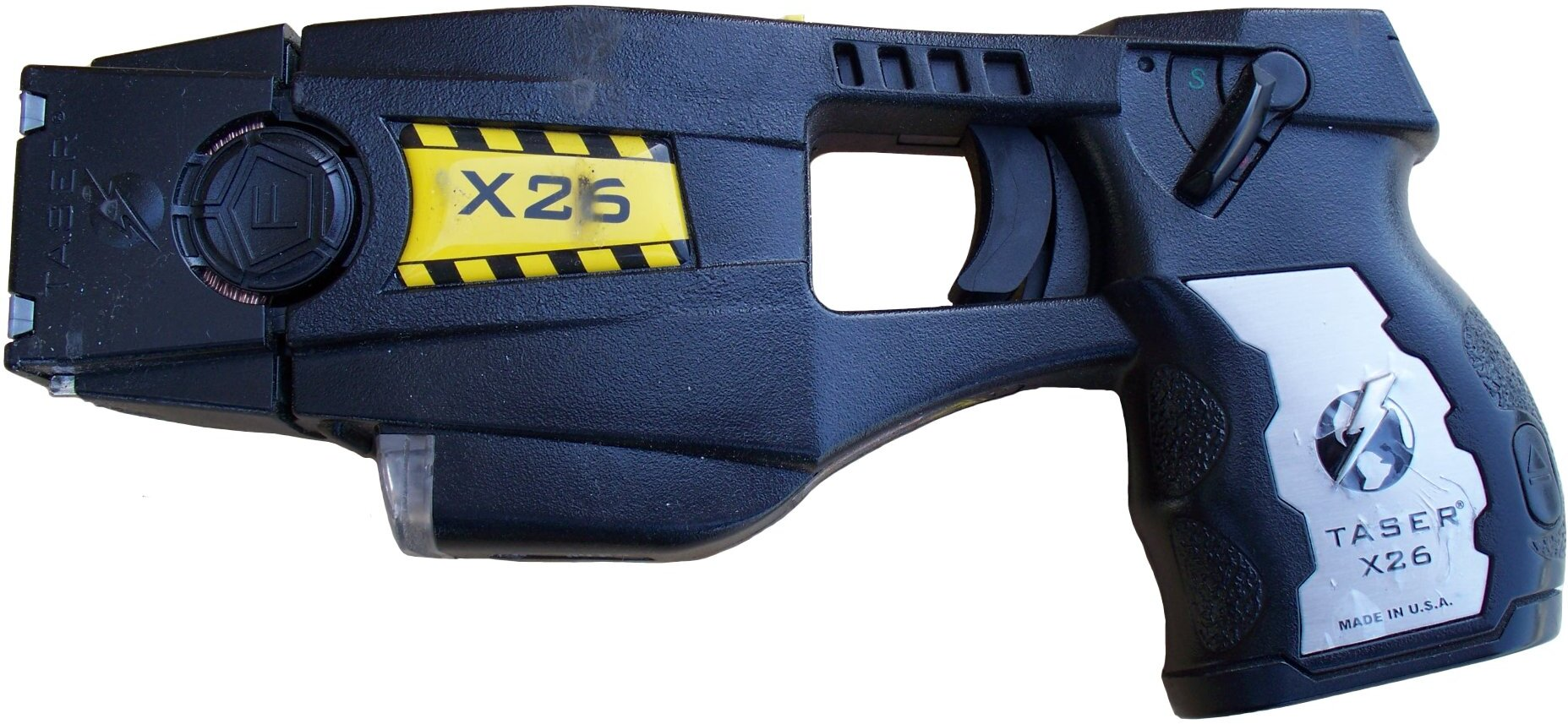
Police issue X26 TASER device with cartridge installed

The Taser is a less-lethal, not non-lethal, weapon, since the possibility of serious injury or death exists whenever the weapon is deployed. It is a brand of conducted electroshock weapon sold by Axon, formerly TASER International. Axon has identified increased risk in repeated, extended, or continuous exposure to the weapon; the Police Executive Research Forum says that total exposure should not exceed 15 seconds.

A 2012 study published in the American Heart Association's journal Circulation found that Tasers can cause "ventricular arrhythmias, sudden cardiac arrest and even death". At least 49 people died in 2018 in the US after being shocked by police with a Taser.

Medical conditions or use of drugs can significantly heighten such risk for subjects in an at-risk category. In some cases however, death occurred after Taser use coupled with the use of force alone, such as positional asphyxiation, with no evidence of underlying medical condition and no use of drugs.

== "Less lethal" weapon ==
Taser International previously described its devices as "non lethal", but changed to use the term "less lethal", which is a term for "intermediate weapons" in the lexicon of law enforcement.

While they are not technically considered lethal, some authorities and non-governmental organizations question both the degree of safety presented by the weapon and the ethical implications of using a weapon that some, such as sections of Amnesty International, allege is inhumane. As a consequence, Amnesty International Canada and other civil liberties organizations have argued that a moratorium should be placed on Taser use until research can determine a way for them to be safely used. In 2012 Amnesty International documented over 500 deaths that occurred after the use of Tasers.

A 2012 study published in the American Heart Association's journal Circulation found that Tasers can cause "ventricular arrhythmias, sudden cardiac arrest and even death". In 2014, NAACP State Conference President Scot X. Esdaile and the Connecticut NAACP argued that Tasers cause lethal results. Reuters reported that more than 1,000 people shocked with a Taser by police died through the end of 2018 with 153 of those deaths being attributed to or related to the use of Tasers. Approximately 49 people died in 2018 in the US after being shocked by police with a Taser. Fulton County, Georgia District Attorney Paul Howard Jr. said in 2020 that “under Georgia law, a taser is considered as a deadly weapon.”

== Other medical issues ==
In 2008 San Francisco cardiologist and electrophysiologist Zian Tseng told the Braidwood Inquiry that a healthy individual could die from a Taser discharge, depending on electrode placement on the chest and pulse timing. He said that the risk of serious injury or death is increased by the number of activations, adrenaline or drugs in the bloodstream, and a susceptible medical history. Tseng said that when he began researching Tasers and spoke of his concerns three years previously Taser International contacted him, asking him to reconsider his media statements and offering funding, which Tseng refused saying he wanted to remain independent.

Taser darts penetrate the skin, and therefore may pose a hazard for transmitting diseases via blood. U.S. Occupational Safety and Health Administration (OSHA) requirements and the bloodborne pathogen protocols should be followed when removing a Taser probe. The removal process may also be addressed in an exposure control plan (ECP) in order to increase Taser probe removal safety.

One issue often raised with the use of the Taser are the effects of metabolic acidosis. This is a temporary condition where the body produces lactic acid within the muscles in the same way as it does during strenuous physical exercise.

== Risk of fire ==
Tasers, like other electric devices, have been found to ignite flammable materials. For this reason Tasers come with express instructions not to use them where flammable liquids or fumes may be present, such as filling stations and methamphetamine labs.

An evaluative study carried out in 2001 by the British Home Office investigated the potential for Tasers to ignite CS spray. Seven trials were conducted, in which CS gas containing methyl isobutyl ketone (a solvent in CS sprays used by all of the police forces in the United Kingdom) was sprayed over mannequins wearing street clothing. The Tasers were then fired at the mannequins. In two of the seven trials, "the flames produced were severe and engulfed the top half of the mannequin, including the head". This poses a particular problem for law enforcement, as some police departments approve the use of CS before the use of a Taser.

However, in the United States, a water or oil based pepper spray is more common than CS. This allows for the possibility of a Taser being used after an individual has been subjected to pepper spray without the concern for a fire.

== Manufacturer's risk acknowledgments; breathing ==
Taser International has stated in a training bulletin that repeated blasts of a taser can "impair breathing and respiration". Also, on Taser's website it is stated that, for a subject in a state described as "excited delirium", repeated or prolonged stuns with the Taser can contribute to "significant and potentially fatal health risks". (The term "excited delirium" is not recognized by the American Medical Association or American Psychological Association. but was recently recognized by the American College of Emergency Physicians). In such a state, physical restraint by the police coupled with the exertion by the subject are considered likely to result in death or more injuries. Critics alleged that electroshock devices can damage delicate electrical equipment such as pacemakers, but tests conducted by the Cleveland Clinic found that Tasers did not interfere with pacemakers and implantable defibrillators.

== Probe removal safety ==
1. Taser probes (also known as Taser darts) qualify as a "sharp" according to the U.S. Occupational Safety and Health Administration (OSHA) definition of "sharps". This is important because the proper removal and treatment of a sharp is an OSHA issue in the US.
2. If an individual receives a needlestick injury during the Taser dart removal, or if an individual is exposed to bloodborne diseases during the removal, the incident is called an "exposure incident". The individual subject to the exposure incident may or may not have contracted bloodborne diseases while removing the Taser dart or while having the Taser dart removed. Extensive testing is the next step in the process. This can be an expensive and stressful event. Possible bloodborne diseases that may be contracted include HIV, hepatitis B virus (HBV), hepatitis C virus (HCV), and other bloodborne pathogens". Methicillin-resistant Staphylococcus aureus (MRSA) is also a bloodborne pathogen.
3. Current methods of removal: OSHA does not give clear guidance as to how to remove the probes, the guidelines only stating that the removal must be done safely. Current methods of Taser Darts include removing the probes by hand, removing the probe with pliers or similar tools, or using the D.A.R.T. Pro and X-TRACTOR TIP Removal System made by Global Pathogen Solutions. When handling contaminated sharps OSHA guidelines should always be followed.
  Special precautions should be taken when a Taser dart is being removed from sensitive areas.
4. Disposal issues: Proper disposal of the contaminated darts includes placing the probes into a puncture-resistant, leak-proof container.
5. OSHA requirements and the Bloodborne Pathogen Protocols should be followed when removing a Taser probe.

The removal process may also be addressed in an Exposure Control Plan in order to increase Taser probe removal safety.

== Cardiac arrests, lawsuits, and effectiveness ==
On September 30, 2009, the manufacturer Taser International issued a warning and new targeting guidelines to law enforcement agencies to aim shots below the chest center of mass as "avoiding chest shots with ECDs avoids the controversy about whether ECDs do or do not affect the human heart" Calgary Police Service indicated in a news interview that the rationale for the warning was "new medical research that is coming out is showing that the closer probe to heart distances have a likelihood, or a possibility, that they may affect the rhythm of the heart".

Taser "recommended officers avoid tasing suspects in the chest area, citing the potential for cardiac arrests, lawsuits and effectiveness of the device". Central Texas Constable Richard McCain, whose deputy used a Taser weapon against an unarmed 72-year-old woman (resulting in a $40,000 lawsuit settlement), describes Taser's directive as "not really practical".

== Deaths and injuries related to Taser use ==
While their intended purpose is to avoid the use of lethal force (firearms), 180 deaths were reported to have been associated with Tasers in the US by 2006. By 2019 that figure had increased to over 1,000 It is unclear in each case whether the Taser was the cause of death, but several legislators in the U.S. have filed bills clamping down on them and requesting more studies on their effects. A study led by William Bozeman of Wake Forest Baptist Medical Center of nearly 1,000 persons subjected to Taser use concluded that 99.7% of the subjects had suffered no injuries, or minor ones such as scrapes and bruises, while three persons suffered injuries severe enough to need hospital admission, and two died. Bozeman's study found that "...paired anterior probe impacts potentially capable of producing a transcardiac discharge vector." occurred in 21.9% of all deployments. Multiple studies have since concluded that CEW use directly impacts cardiac and brain function, and can lead to cardiac arrest as well as dangerously elevated heart rate.

The head of the U.S. southern regional office of Amnesty International, Jared Feuer, said that 277 people in the United States have died after being shocked by a Taser between June 2001 and October 2007, which has already been documented. He also said that about 80% of those on whom a Taser was used by U.S. police were unarmed. "Tasers interfere with a basic equation, which is that force must always be proportional to the threat", Feuer said. "They are being used in a situation where a firearm or even a baton would never be justified." A spokesperson for Taser International said that if a person dies from a "tasering" it is instantaneous and not days later. Taser International announced that it is "transmitting over 60 legal demand letters requiring correction of... false and misleading headlines."

The Guardian newspaper was running a database, The Counted, in 2015, tracking US killings by police and other law enforcement agencies that year. As of 6 November 2015, 47 deaths of the 965 killed were classified as taser events.

== Training ==
=== Police ===
On 5 July 2005 Michael Todd, then Chief Constable of Greater Manchester Police, England, let himself be shot in the back with a Taser, to demonstrate his confidence that Tasers can be used safely. This was captured on video, and the video was released to the BBC on 17 May 2007. He was wearing a shirt and no jacket. When tased, he fell forward onto his chest on the ground, and (he said afterwards) "I couldn't move, it hurt like hell", he said after recovering. "I wouldn't want to do that again."

Although tests on police and military volunteers have shown Tasers to function appropriately on a healthy, calm individual in a relaxed and controlled environment, the real-life target of a Taser is, if not mentally or physically unsound, in a state of high stress and in the midst of a confrontation. According to the UK's Defence Scientific Advisory Council's subcommittee on the Medical Implications of Less-lethal Weapons (DoMILL), "The possibility that other factors such as illicit drug intoxication, alcohol abuse, pre-existing heart disease, and cardioactive therapeutic drugs may modify the threshold for generation of cardiac arrhythmias cannot be excluded." In addition, Taser experiments "do not take into account real life use of Tasers by law enforcement agencies, such as repeated or prolonged shocks and the use of restraints".

Police officers in at least five US states have filed lawsuits against Taser International claiming they suffered serious injuries after being shocked with the device during training classes.

Medical literature reports that one police officer suffered spine fractures after being shocked by a Taser during a demonstration.

=== Military ===
A February 2005 memorandum from the Aberdeen Proving Ground, a United States Army weapons test site, discouraged shocking soldiers with Tasers in training, contrary to Taser International's recommendations. The Army's occupational health sciences director warned that "Seizures and ventricular fibrillation can be induced by the electric current." and that "the practice of using these weapons on U.S. Army military and civilian forces in training is not recommended, given the potential risks."

== Use as a torture device ==
The United Nations Committee against Torture reports that the use of Tasers can be a form of torture, due to the acute pain they cause, and warns against the possibility of death in some cases. The use of stun belts has been condemned by Amnesty International as torture, not only for the physical pain the devices cause, but also for their heightened abuse potential. Amnesty International has reported several alleged cases of excessive electroshock gun use that possibly amount to torture. They have also raised extensive concerns about the use of other electro-shock devices by American police and in American prisons, as they can be (and according to Amnesty International, sometimes are) used to inflict cruel pain on individuals.

Tasers may also not leave the telltale markings that a conventional beating might. The American Civil Liberties Union has also raised concerns about their use, as has the British human rights organization Resist Cardiac Arrest.

== Comparison to alternatives ==
Critics claim that risk-averse police officers resort to using Taser in situations in which they otherwise would have used more conventional, less violent alternatives, such as trying to reason with a cornered suspect.

Supporters claim that electroshock weapons such as Tasers are more effective than other means including pepper-spray (an eye/breathing inflammatory agent), batons or other conventional ways of inflicting pain, even handguns, at bringing a subject down to the ground with minimum physical exertion.

Supporters claim that electroshock guns are a safer alternative to devices such as firearms. Taser International now uses the term, "less lethal" instead of "non-lethal", which does not mean the weapon cannot cause death, but that it is not intended to be fatal, and in most cases is not. Non-lethal weapons are defined as "weapons that are explicitly designed and primarily employed so as to incapacitate personnel or material, while minimizing fatalities, permanent injury to personnel, and undesired damage to property and the environment."

== Chronology ==
Several incidents have received publicity.

=== 2003 ===
- In November 2003 in Las Vegas, Nevada, police officer Lisa Peterson was severely injured (including traumatic internal disc disruption and persistent dizziness) during a training exercise under controlled conditions.

=== 2004 ===
- A 2004 CBS News report described 70 deaths believed to be caused by the Taser, including 10 in August 2004 alone. At that time Amnesty International reported the number as 150 since June 2001.

=== 2005 ===
- July 2005, UK. West Yorkshire Police tasered a man in hypoglycemic shock, while unresponsive and alone on a bus in a bus depot, believing that he was a potential security threat.
- A medical examiner ruled for the first time that a Taser was the primary factor in a death.

=== 2006 ===
- April 2006, United States. A 56-year-old, wheelchair-using woman died after ten taser shocks; the death was ruled a homicide.
- November 2006, United States. UCLA Taser incident.

=== 2007 ===
- September 2007, United States. See University of Florida Taser incident.
- October 2007, Canada. See Killing of Robert Dziekański.
- November 2007, Halifax, Nova Scotia, Canada. Police had tasered Howard Hyde up to five times approximately 30 hours before he died.
- November 2007, Chilliwack, British Columbia, Canada. Robert Knipstrom, 36, died five days after an altercation with police.
- December 2007, Montreal, Quebec, Canada. Death of Quilem Registre.

In October and November 2007, four individuals died after being tasered in Canada, leading to calls for review of its use. The highest-profile of these cases was that of Robert Dziekański, a non-English speaking man from Poland who died in less than two minutes after being tasered by Royal Canadian Mounted Police (RCMP) at the Vancouver International Airport, October 14, 2007. The tasering was captured on home video and was broadcast nationally. This was followed by three further death-after-tasering incidents in Montreal, Halifax, Nova Scotia, and Chilliwack, British Columbia, leading Amnesty International to demand Taser use end in Canada, as it had records of 16 other such deaths in the country.

- November 18, 2007, a 20-year-old man in Frederick, Maryland, fell unconscious and died also right after being tasered.
- November 2007, United States. Christian Allen incident:

On November 18, 2007, in Jacksonville, Florida, Christian Allen, 21, was pulled over by police because his car radio was too loud. After a struggle he and a passenger escaped on foot, an officer gave chase, caught Allen and tasered him at least three times. Allen died later in custody.

On December 12, 2007, in response to the death of Robert Dziekański, Canadian Public Safety Minister Stockwell Day requested that the federal Commission for Public Complaints Against the RCMP (CPC) prepare recommendations for immediate implementation. The CPC report recommended to "immediately restrict the use of the conducted energy weapon (CEW)" by reclassifying it as an "impact weapon." The commission released its report on June 18, 2008; recommendations include restricting use to experienced officers (5 years or more), providing medical attention to those who have been shocked, and improving previous documentation of specific deployment of the weapon, among other things.

=== 2008 ===
- On January 12, 2008, in Winnfield, Louisiana, Baron Pikes died after being shocked nine times with a Taser by a police officer. Pikes was handcuffed and six of the shocks were administered within less than three minutes.
- April 24, 2008, United States. Kevin Piskura died after being stunned by an X-26 Taser for 10 seconds while interfering with a friend's arrest by police in Oxford, Ohio. He was hospitalized after the confrontation and died five days later. Video and audio of the event were recorded by the X-26's mounted camera.
- In June 2008, a federal jury ordered Taser International to pay the family of Robert Heston, Jr., $6 million in punitive and compensatory damages for the 2005 death of the man who died a day after being shocked repeatedly by officers using Tasers. According to a press report, the jury "found that Arizona-based stun-gun manufacturer Taser International should have more effectively warned police that Taser shocks were potentially dangerous."
- July 22, 2008, Winnipeg, Manitoba, Canada, a 17-year-old aboriginal teen died after being tasered during a standoff. The teen was carrying a knife during the incident.
- July 29, 2008, Statesville, North Carolina, a man died after being shocked multiple times while in police custody after having been arrested for shoplifting an Applebee's gift card.
- September 24, 2008, United States. Iman Morales fell 10 feet to the ground and died after being tasered.
- Summit County, Ohio medical examiner Lisa J. Kohler cited Taser use as a cause of death in three cases, namely those of Mark D. McCullaugh, Dennis S. Hyde, and Richard Holcomb. Taser International sued, and on May 2, 2008, visiting judge Ted Schneiderman ordered the medical examiner to remove all references to "Taser" in the reports and change the cause of death in McCullaugh's case from "Homicide" to "Undetermined".

=== 2009 ===
- January 8, 2009, Martinsville, Virginia. Seventeen-year-old Derick Jones was fatally tasered by officer R. L. Wray of the Martinsville Police Department. The autopsy revealed that Jones was in good health with a healthy heart and no pre-existing conditions, as well as no drugs other than alcohol in his system. The medical examiner ruled that his death was the result of a random cardiac arrhythmia, with no direct cause. However, she explicitly ruled out all direct causes of this arrhythmia except for the Taser, which she stated could not be definitively ruled out "as a causative or contributive factor" in Jones' death. Critics have pointed to cases like these to show how Taser's aggressive litigation history involving medical examiners may have affected their rulings, or prevented them from decisively citing a Taser as the cause of death, despite the fact that all other causes were definitively ruled out.
- April 16, 2009, Michigan, United States. Robert Mitchell, a 5-foot 2-inch 110 lb 16-year-old with a learning disability was tasered and died after fleeing a vehicle in which he was a passenger during a routine traffic stop.

=== 2010 ===
- May 21, 2010, Tybee Island, Georgia, an 18-year-old man with autism is injured after being tasered by police.
- July 2010, A stand-off in Rothbury between British police and armed fugitive Raoul Moat ended after two Tasers were discharged, possibly causing Moat to pull the trigger to end his own life. An inquest is ongoing.
- August 18, 2010, Dublin, California, Martin Harrison, a 50-year-old Oakland man being held in Santa Rita Jail, died after being shocked twice by a Taser during a fight with deputies. The fight occurred on Monday night, and he died in a hospital about 5 a.m. Wednesday.
- August 20, 2010, Washtenaw County, Michigan, Stanley Jackson Jr., a 31-year-old father of four from Belleville died hours after being tasered by Washtenaw County police. AnnArbor.com reports that Jackson, a former high school running back with no known medical problems, was shot by police at his mother's Superior township home and died two hours after being admitted to St. Joseph Mercy Hospital.
- September 9, 2010 David Smith, 28 died after being tasered by police in Minneapolis, MN. Police officers tasered him after being called to a YMCA in downtown Minneapolis where David Smith was refusing to leave. David Smith went into cardiac arrest after being tasered and later died. He was unarmed when tasered.
- September 17, 2010 Oklahoma City, Oklahoma, Gary Lee Grossenbacher, 48, dies after being tasered by police, while resisting arrest following a domestic disturbance call. This follows an incident on July 6, 2010 in Oklahoma City, during which Damon Lamont Falls, 31, was tasered as he fled from an alleged robbery attempt, and subsequently died.
- October 5, 2010, Sydney, Australia, Un-identified man killed by a police taser. He lost consciousness shortly after he was tasered and was taken to Liverpool Hospital where he later died.
- November 30, 2010, Colombes, France, a 38-year-old illegal immigrant from Mali dies after having been tasered twice by police, who said the man threatened officers with a hammer. Tear gas and a baton were also used, and an inquiry was ordered to determine the exact cause of death.

=== 2011 ===
- May 6, 2011, Boynton Beach, Florida, a female police officer was treated for hearing loss after a fellow officer deliberately placed and activated a taser behind her ear.
- June 6, 2011, Oakland Park, Florida, James Doe, 31 years old, 130 pounds, was tasered while handcuffed and locked in the back of a power cruiser; he was kicking the doors and windows. He became irresponsive, and was pronounced dead at Florida Medical Center.
- June 28, 2011, Northolt, United Kingdom, an 82-year-old was hospitalised for several days after his arrest.
- August 6, 2011, Cincinnati, Ohio, an 18-year-old attending summer classes at the University of Cincinnati was struck by a campus officer's stun gun and died of cardiac arrest.
- August 7, 2011, Manassas, Virginia, a 29-year-old being treated by paramedics died after police used a Taser on him.
- August 16, 2011, Barrow-in-Furness, Cumbria UK, Dale Burns, 27, became unwell shortly after police tasered him at least three times. He was taken to hospital and was pronounced dead soon afterwards.
- August 23, 2011, Over Hulton, near Bolton, UK, Philip Hulmes, 53, dies in hospital after stabbing himself in the abdomen and subsequently getting tasered.
- Sept 13, 2011, Damon Barnett, in Fresno, California, died after being tasered on a highway.
- September 2011, Pinellas Park, Florida, Danielle Maudsley, 19, was left in a persistent vegetative state, after falling and hitting her head following being tasered. She was fleeing the police station, handcuffed, and officer Daniel Cole tasered her from behind, without a warning, in lieu of physical contact. He was cleared of wrongdoing. At the time she had cocaine and Oxycontin in her system. Maudsley had also previously escaped from her handcuffs. Maudsley never awoke from her coma and died in 2013
- October 31, 2011, Colonie, New York, Charles Brothers, 32, died after being tasered at a gym. He had damaged property and instigated fights with another man and the police prior to receiving multiple shocks.
- November 15, 2011 London, United Kingdom, Justice Livingstone survived being tasered 9 times, including 3 times in the back of the head. Livingstone had been reported for waving a gun around, he had bought a toy gun for his son. After his arrest Livingstone was sectioned under the mental health act.
- November 15, 2011, Tucson, Arizona, Officer Henry Fung of the Tucson Police Department, was tasered as a training exercise on November 14, but died of a heart attack the next day while visiting his mother. The Police Department has stated that doctors have advised that the taser was not a factor in his death.
- November 16, 2011, San Bernardino, California, Jonathan White, 29, died shortly after being tasered in his home. Under treatment for schizophrenia and bipolar disorder, his mother had called police for help in calming him down. White was resisting the officers, but not attacking them.
- November 22, 2011, Scotland Neck, North Carolina, Roger Anthony, 61, died a day after being tasered whilst cycling. Police had been called after the deaf man had fallen off his bicycle. The caller said Anthony appeared drunk, and may have hurt himself.

=== 2012 ===
- March 18, 2012, Honeymoon Island, Florida, James Clifton Barnes, 37, was struggling but in handcuffs when tasered by Kenneth Kubler, a marine deputy. He stopped breathing, and died a few days later.
- March 18, 2012, Sydney, Australia, Roberto Laudisio Curti, a 21-year-old Brazilian student suspected of stealing a package of biscuits from a convenience store, died during a pursuit by police. CCTV footage shows police forcing the unarmed victim to collide with a glass window and tasering him with his back turned to the officers. The coroner did later find that Curti was suffering acute effects of LSD use. Witnesses said the victim was tasered at least four times and also capsicum sprayed.
- April 8, 2012, Los Angeles, California, American pornographic actor Marlan A. Anderson (39 years old), better known as Sledge Hammer, was tasered twice in "Drive Stun" mode by Los Angeles Police Department during a struggle, went into cardiac arrest for at least 10 minutes, then slipped into a coma. He was taken off life support 5 days later and died. Autopsy results have yet to determine a cause for death and is the incident is under internal review by the LAPD.
- June 4, 2012, Los Angeles, California, 50-year-old Studio City resident Angela Jones was tasered three times by California Highway Patrol. She went into cardiac arrest and was revived after CPR was performed by a CHP officer at the scene.

=== 2013 ===
- March 18, 2013, Jordan Begley dies after police use Taser in Greater Manchester.
- August 6, 2013, Miami, Florida, Israel Hernandez, 18 years old, died after being shocked with a taser in the chest after Miami Beach police spotted him painting graffiti on an empty building. It was later confirmed that the cause of death was sudden cardiac death produced by the shock from the taser.
- October 24, 2013, Edmonton, Alberta, Unidentified, 39-year-old man, died after being shocked with a taser by the Edmonton Police Service.

=== 2014 ===
- March 4, 2014, Miami Gardens, Florida, Treon Johnson, suspected of attacking several dogs, dies hours after being tasered and taken into custody by police.
- September 14, 2014, Kansas City, Missouri, Bryce Masters' heart stopped after the probes from the stun gun struck him in close proximity to his heart. He was placed into a medically-induced coma and treated for lack of oxygen to the brain.
- November 6, 2014, Argoed, South Wales, Matthew Williams, 34, suspected of murdering a woman and allegedly caught in a hotel room eating her face, was tasered and arrested. Moments later he became unresponsive and died.
- December 22, 2014, Newcastle-under-Lyme, a suspected burglar died after being tasered by police in Staffordshire, UK.

=== 2015 ===
- February 3, 2015, Fairfax County jail, Virginia, Natasha McKenna, 37, stopped breathing, her heart stopped, then later died, after a stun gun was used four times on her while restrained with handcuffs and leg shackles.

=== 2016 ===
- May 15, 2016, Wrocław, Poland, Igor Stachowiak, 25, died shortly after being shocked with a taser several times.
- August 15, 2016, former professional football player Dalian Atkinson, 48, died after being tasered in Telford, United Kingdom.

=== 2019 ===
- July 4, 2019, Jared Lakey, a 28-year-old confused but nonviolent man in Wilson, Oklahoma, was shocked 53 times by tasers, resulting in his death by cardiac arrest; two police officers were convicted of second-degree murder for their role in the incident.

=== Analysis ===
Between June 2001 and June 2007, there were at least 245 cases of deaths of subjects after having been shocked using Tasers. Of these cases:

- In 7 cases, medical examiners said Tasers were a cause or a contributing factor or could not be ruled out as a cause of death.
- In 16 cases coroners and other officials stated that a Taser was a secondary or contributory factor of death.
- In dozens of cases, coroners cited excited delirium as cause of death. Excited delirium has been questioned as a medical diagnosis.
- Several deaths occurred as a result of injuries sustained in struggles. In a few of these cases head injury due to falling after being shocked contributed to later death. Some police departments, like that of Clearwater, Florida, have tried to eliminate such incidents by prohibiting taser use when the suspect is in danger of falling.

In 2015, the Washington Post reported that in the 11-month period from January to November 2015, 48 people died in the United States in incidents in which police used Tasers, according to police, court, and autopsy records.

A study published by the American Journal of Cardiology found that California police departments that introduced Tasers experienced significant increases in the numbers of in-custody sudden deaths and firearm deaths in the first full year following deployment. The rates declined to predeployment levels in subsequent years. No significant change in the number of officer injuries was found.

A study by the Potomac Institute concluded: "Based on the available evidence, and on accepted criteria for defining product risk vs. efficacy, we believe that when stun technology is appropriately applied, it is relatively safe and clearly effective. The only known field data that are available suggest that the odds are, at worst, one in one thousand that a stun device would contribute to (and this does not imply "cause") death. This figure is likely not different than the odds of death when stun devices are not used, but when other multiple force measures are. A more defensible figure is one in one hundred thousand."

After hearing many witnesses and briefs the report by the Canadian House of Commons, Standing Committee on Public Safety and National Security makes 17 recommendations as a result the death due to the repetitive tasering of a Polish immigrant at the Vancouver International airport.

An investigation by the Canadian Press and Canadian Broadcasting Corporation found that one-third of those shot by a Taser by the Royal Canadian Mounted Police received injuries that required medical attention as a result. The news agencies used Freedom of Information requests to obtain the Taser-use forms filled out by RCMP officers from 2002 to 2007.

Although the Taser is a programmable device, the controlling software does not limit: a) the number of the bursts of pulses and the time between bursts while the trigger is held down continuously, or b) the number of times the shock cycles can be repeated. Thus the design does not adequately reduce the likelihood that the victim's heart enters into a deadly ventricular fibrillation.

According to a study presented at the Heart Rhythm Society's 2007 Scientific Sessions, Tasers may present risks to subjects with implanted pacemakers. However, a study conducted by the Cleveland Clinic in 2007 on a single animal determined that a standard five-second Taser X26 application "does not affect the short-term functional integrity of implantable pacemakers and defibrillators.... The long-term effects were not assessed."

A study conducted by electrical engineer James Ruggieri and published December 2005 in the Journal of the National Academy of Forensic Engineers measured a Taser's output as 39 times more powerful than specified. The study concluded that the discharge is sufficient to trigger ventricular fibrillation, a 50 percent risk according to the IEC 479-1 series of electric safety standards. Ruggieri said that high rise-time pulses breaks down skin tissue, decreasing its resistance and increasing current through the body. Ruggieri showed that when the skin resistance drops lower than the device's region of linear operation, the current dramatically increases.

A later study done by Pierre Savard, Ing., PhD., Ecole Polythechnique de Montreal, et al., for the Canadian Broadcasting Corporation (CBC), reproduced the results of the Ruggieri study and indicated that the threshold of energy needed to induce deadly ventricular fibrillation decreased dramatically with each successive burst of pulses. The threshold for women may be less.

A 2007 study published in The American Journal of Forensic Medicine and Pathology questioned the apparent contradiction created by the claim that the Taser X26 does not stimulate the heart muscle, while clearly causing skeletal muscle contraction and stimulation. They estimated the average current pulse of the X26 at 1 ampere. They concluded that it is primarily proximity (or lack thereof) of the heart to the electrodes that prevents stimulation of the heart, along with the short duration of the pulse, which allows the heart to return to near its baseline state prior to the next pulse, due to the larger time constant for the heart muscle vs skeletal muscles. They estimated a 0.4% chance of heart muscle stimulation among the general population with optimum (or worst case) electrode placement, which would normally resolve itself with the resumption of a normal heart beat.

In 2006, the US National Institute of Justice began a two-year study into Taser-related deaths in custody.

A Chicago study suggests that use of the Taser can interfere with heart function. A team of scientists and doctors at the Cook County hospitaltrauma center stunned 6 pigs with two 40-second Taser discharges across the chest. Every animal was left with heart rhythm problems and two of the subjects died of cardiac arrest. One of the subjects died three minutes after being shot indicating, according to researcher Bob Walker, that "after the Taser shock ends, there can still be effects that can be evoked and you can still see cardiac effects."

== Taser and handgun confusion ==
According to the Star Tribune, by April 2021 there had been 16 known cases, including the killing of Daunte Wright in Brooklyn Center, Minnesota, when a police officer in the United States fired a pistol at someone but claimed to have intended to use a Taser instead. Other notable incidents included a 2002 shooting in Rochester, Minnesota, the fatal 2009 shooting of Oscar Grant by a Bay Area Rapid Transit officer in Oakland, California, and the deadly 2015 shooting of Eric Harris by a volunteer reserve deputy in Tulsa, Oklahoma. In 2018, an officer coming to assist a policeman being assaulted during a traffic stop shot and wounded the arrestee in Lawrence, Kansas. After discharging her gun, startled, she yelled, "Oh, shit, I shot him." Though that officer was charged, a judge dismissed the charges. In 2019, a scuffle in a jail cell led to another accidental shooting by a backup officer in New Hope, Pennsylvania. The Bucks County, Pennsylvania District Attorney declined to press charges against the officer, saying state law excused the officer's conduct from criminal prosecution because of his "honest but mistaken" belief he was firing his Taser when he shot the wounded prisoner. In both the Kansas and Pennsylvania cases, the officers shouted "Taser" before firing their gun.

== Other legal issues and court cases ==
According to Taser International, Tasers are intended "to incapacitate dangerous, combative, or high-risk subjects who pose a risk to law enforcement/correctional officers, innocent citizens, or themselves".

Tasers are illegal or subject to legal restrictions on their availability and use in many jurisdictions. According to Taser International, the taser is legal for civilian use without restriction in 34 states in the United States, and legal with some form of restriction in the remaining states in the United States, with the exception of the state of Hawaii, where the Taser is illegal for civilian use.

Police officers in at least five US states have filed lawsuits against Taser International claiming they suffered serious injuries after being shocked with the device during training classes.

Summit County, Ohio Medical Examiner Lisa J. Kohler cited Taser use as a cause of death in three cases, Mark D. McCullaugh, Dennis S. Hyde, and Richard Holcomb. Taser International sued, and on May 2, 2008, visiting judge Ted Schneiderman ordered the Medical Examiner to remove all references to "Taser" in the reports and change the cause of death in McCullaugh's case from "Homicide" to "Undetermined".

On June 9, 2008, Taser International lost its first product-liability suit.

=== Commission for Public Complaints Against the RCMP - 18 June 2008 report ===
The Commissioner for Public Complaints made several recommendations regarding the use of Tasers by the Royal Canadian Mounted Police (RCMP) including:

- RCMP members with less than five years of operational experience should be prohibited from using Taser stun guns.
- Individuals who are tasered should receive prompt medical attention, thereby possibly saving their lives.

=== Compliance Strategy Group Independent Review of the RCMP – June 2008 ===
Compliance Strategy Group (John Kiedrowski, Principal Consultant, Michael Petrunik and Ronald-Frans Melchers, Associate Consultants) conducted An Independent Review of the Adoption and Use of Conducted Energy Weapons by the Royal Canadian Mounted Police that was completed in June 2008, but only released under access to information and privacy around September 12, 2008. The report is available from the RCMP under access to information, but is censored (e.g., no recommendations). The report as released by the RCMP may be found on the Canadian Broadcasting Corporation website www.cbc.ca. The Report reviews how the RCMP made the decisions to introduce the conducted energy weapons, training, policies and procedures, and accountability. The report is approximately 150 pages and provides an analysis on how a police force adopted the Taser. The authors of the report argued that the police did not do their due diligences, and are concerned about training and the issue of accountability. The report also notes that the police in Canada have misclassified the Taser as a prohibited weapon whereas under the criminal code it is referred to as a prohibited firearm, and refers to excited delirium as "folk knowledge".

== See also ==
- UCLA Taser incident
- University of Florida Taser incident
- Death of Jordan Begley
- Robert Dziekański Taser incident
- Braidwood Inquiry
