= Death of Jordan Begley =

- Family photograph of Begley
- Date: 10 July 2013
- Location: Gorton, Manchester
- Cause: Cardiac arrest
- Deaths: Jordan Begley

Jordan Lee Begley, also known as Jordon Begley, a 23-year-old English man, died of cardiac arrest on 10 July 2013. An inquest in 2015 found that Begley's death had been partly due to the actions of Greater Manchester Police officers who shot him with a Taser while they restrained and handcuffed him around two hours prior to his death.

== Background ==
Begley grew up in Wythenshawe, Manchester, and moved to Gorton, Manchester aged 17. After getting into trouble with police in his teens, he began working in an ice cream factory. His mother, Dorothy Begley, said her son "grew up overnight". Dorothy Begley had previously called 999 on New Year's Eve 2011 because Jordan had become aggressive and threatened to harm others and himself; however, he later returned home without incident.

A month before his death Begley had received tests for blackouts and intermittent chest pain. No abnormality was found, but doctors asked him to return for a more detailed test. Begley did not attend the appointment. Begley was a heavy drinker and used cocaine. At the time of his death he had intended to put down a deposit for a flat for himself, his girlfriend and her daughter.

Figures published by the Home Office show that since the introduction of Tasers in 2003, their use had increased by more than 200 percent, that more than one in every ten officers carried a Taser, and that more than 10,000 tasering incidents had been recorded in England and Wales in 2013.

== Taser incident and death ==
Dorothy Begley initially called police on the evening of 10 July 2013 as her son had become upset following an argument with neighbours and was threatening to take a knife outside, causing her to fear that there would be "a murder". She did not tell Begley she had called the police.

Armed Greater Manchester Police (GMP) officers rushed into Begley's dining room in Gorton. Eleven officers were deployed. Begley was initially outside the house but agreed to go inside with the officers, and a standoff developed, which ended with Police Constable (PC) Terrence Donnelly drawing his Taser X26 and opening fire. Begley was immediately restrained when he offered minimal resistance.

Begley was punched twice by PC Christopher Mills as other officers attempted to handcuff him. He was hit with "distraction strikes" and shot with a 50,000-volt Taser while he was handcuffed and restrained by three armed officers. The Taser shot lasted nine seconds and was from a distance of 70 centimetres. It was attributed by police to Donnelly having entered "a high state of alert." The officers left Begley lying face-down with his hands cuffed behind his back.

The inquest was later told that Donnelly had been made aware that Begley was potentially in possession of a knife. Donnelly said that Begley's hands were in his pockets, and that he asked him to show his hands to determine the whereabouts of a weapon, and to stop moving. According to Donnelly, Begley continued to approach him, after which he told him to stand still, then deployed the Taser. Dorothy Begley said her son had been "doing exactly what they wanted him to do" when the Taser was used.

The inquest jury's verdict said that after Begley was forced to the floor the officers did not attempt to determine whether he was conscious, and ignored the fact that he did not cry out or speak. When he was turned over on to his back it became clear that he was in distress. Sergeant Andrew Wright said Begley had an "ashen" colour to his face and a "golf ball"-sized lump on his head when he was rolled over, and that his breathing was irregular. Officers removed his handcuffs and attempted to revive him using a trauma kit, cardiopulmonary resuscitation and a defibrillator.

Begley died in Manchester Royal Infirmary at 10:00 p.m. on 10 July, around two hours after the incident, from a cardiac arrest. Begley was 23 at the time of his death. His funeral, which was paid for by the police, took place at Sacred Heart Church in Gorton on 17 September 2013.

In August 2013 Dorothy Begley said she believed her son's death was due to a case of mistaken identity relating to a 25-year-old man from Sale, Greater Manchester also named Jordan Begley, who was on the run from prison. Begley said that on the night of her son's death an officer had questioned her about links to Sale. Assistant Chief Constable Dawn Copley said police were "not aware of any evidence to support that suggestion at this time."

== Inquest ==
An inquest was held at Manchester civil courts of justice over a period of five weeks in 2015.

Lawyers for Donnelly and four other officers unsuccessfully sought a permanent anonymity order, which would have prevented their being identified at the inquest. In February 2015 Manchester coroner Nigel Meadows refused the anonymity order, and named Donnelly, Mills, PC Peter Fox, PC Dave Graham and PC Andrew Wright as the officers who were present at the scene. Meadows said he had not been persuaded by arguments that the officers would face reprisals if their identities were publicised.

Donnelly, Fox, Graham, Mills and Wright, all serving GMP officers, gave evidence. In June 2015 Wright denied colluding with other officers regarding his evidence. Medical experts who gave evidence said the Taser was "unlikely" to have contributed to Begley's cardiac arrest. The coroner said the inquest had "been a long case with a lot of evidence" which had been "different and inconsistent". The jury retired on 2 July.

The jury concluded in a narrative verdict on 6 July that the use of the Taser did not directly cause Begley's heart to stop, but the restraint and the Taser "more than materially contributed" to a combination of stressful factors which triggered cardiac arrest. Other factors included Begley's alcoholism, his drug abuse, a dispute with neighbours, and the confrontation with police which followed. The jury also found that Donnelly had acted "inappropriately and unreasonably" in using the Taser for longer than was necessary, and found that the two punches delivered as "distraction blows" by one officer were unnecessary. The verdict said "there was no need to punch twice without even checking his first response to the first punch." The jury also found that the officers were "more concerned about their own welfare" than that of Begley. The ruling marked the first time an inquest jury had found the use of a Taser to have contributed to a death.

=== Response ===
Begley's family said after the outcome of the inquest that they intended to sue the GMP. Dorothy Begley called for the immediate introduction of police body cameras and questioned why the officers involved had not been disciplined. She described the decision as "fantastic" and said "After two years of fighting everybody, fighting the system, Jordon's day has come. That is all I ever wanted. The last two years have been hell." Dorothy Begley's lawyer, Mark McGhee, said the inquest's outcome would extend "far beyond the death of this one individual".

Ian Hanson, the chair of the GMP branch of the Police Federation of England and Wales, emphasised the "dynamic" nature and short time-frame of the situation in which the Taser was used, and said "Unlike a jury, officers do not have five weeks to take decisions, and many of the [jury's] criticisms do not appear to us to reflect the reality and duration of this incident." Dawn Copley, the GMP's assistant chief constable said the verdict "raised a number of serious concerns, including the way the Taser was used, the use of force by the officers after the Taser was deployed and ... the communication between the officers who attended Jordon's home." Copley said the GMP would "examine the jury's findings in detail" and liaise with the IPCC and that she had restricted the duties of the officers involved.

In the wake of the verdict the National Police Chiefs' Council called for an independent body to examine the medical evidence and determine whether safety advice on Tasers should be changed in light of Begley's death. GMP Chief Constable Peter Fahy defended the use of Tasers by police, and said the record of British police in terms of force was "remarkable."

== IPCC/IOPC investigations ==
The Independent Police Complaints Commission (IPCC) also conducted an investigation, which effectively exonerated the officers involved. As of July 2015 the IPCC had not published the results of its investigation. The result of the inquest caused the IPCC to review its investigation, and in August 2016 the IPCC won permission for a judicial review of its own report into Begley's death. This was the first time the IPCC had applied for a judicial review of an independent investigation. The Queen's Counsel representing the IPCC argued before the High Court of Justice that the preparation of the report had been characterised by "a serious departure" from statutory requirements.

In November 2016 the High Court of Justice quashed the IPCC report and the exoneration of the officers. An IPCC spokesperson said a new investigation would be performed by new personnel. In June 2018, the IPCC's successor body the Independent Office for Police Conduct (IOPC) announced provisional findings that five of the six officers under investigation had no case to answer, while one, who had since left the force, "may have breached the professional standards of behaviour in relation to their use of force." Dorothy Begley was informed in summer 2018 that none of the officers would be charged with an offence. The IOPC published its report in October 2018, named Donnelly as the officer who had left the force, and concluded that he would have had a case to answer on grounds of gross misconduct had he remained a police officer, but would not have faced dismissal.

== See also ==
- Killing of Robert Dziekański, in which Dziekański died after he was shot with a Taser in Canada in 2007
- Taser safety issues
