= University of Florida Taser incident =

2007 incident at a forum with John Kerry

Two University of Florida police officers attempt to grab and force Andrew Meyer out of the auditorium.

On September 17, 2007, a University of Florida student was stunned by police with a taser at a forum featuring then–U.S. Senator John Kerry. Kerry was addressing a Constitution Day forum at the University of Florida campus in Gainesville that was organized by the ACCENT Speakers Bureau, an agency of the university's student government. Andrew Meyer, a 21-year-old fourth-year undergraduate mass communication student, had initially been allowed to ask a question after the close of the question period. He asked Kerry whether he was a member of the Skull and Bones society and used the term "blowjob" in reference to the impeachment of Bill Clinton. Meyer was forcibly pulled away from the microphone. He was immediately restrained, removed, and subsequently arrested by university police. During his arrest, Meyer struggled and screamed for help. While six officers held Meyer down, one of the officers drive-stunned him with a taser following Meyer's shouted plea to the police "Don't tase me, bro!"

Several videos of the episode were posted online, with one version reaching eight million views on YouTube. The New Oxford American Dictionary listed tase, or "taze" as one of the words of the year for 2007, popularized by the widespread use of Meyer's phrase. Meyer registered "Don't tase me, bro" as a trademark in September 2007.

== Details ==
=== Student ===
At the time of the incident, Andrew Meyer was an undergraduate student at the University of Florida. Born in Fort Lauderdale, Florida, he attended Cypress Bay High School in Weston, Florida, where he worked at the school newspaper, The Circuit, and was a member of the National Honor Society. At the University of Florida, Meyer worked as a columnist for the college paper Independent Florida Alligator. Meyer has stated that he writes "mostly whimsical nonsense columns about nothing in particular, yet occasionally finds himself angry enough to rain down fire and brimstone on an unsuspecting politician or celebrity."

He received international publicity when videos were posted of police tasering him at the town hall forum featuring Senator Kerry. The Miami Herald stated that "Meyer's grandmother, Lucy Meyer of Pembroke Pines, Florida, told The Miami Herald that he is a hardworking student with no prior run-ins with the law." She also said, "He gets very, very overcome with passion for whatever he is feeling. Maybe that passion took over."

Today, an American morning television show, interviewed Meyer a month after the incident, once he had negotiated probation.

Meyer later attended the Florida International University College of Law, and registered "Don't tase me, bro" as a trademark in September 2007, using the publicity to sell T-shirts on his website. As of July 15, 2016, the phrase is no longer trademarked. Meyer wrote a book titled Don't Tase Me Bro! Real Questions, Fake News, and My Life as a Meme, which he published on Amazon in December 2018.

=== Incident prior to start of video ===
Meyer was reportedly in line for access to the microphone when former Ambassador Dennis Jett, a University of Florida political science instructor and the forum's moderator, announced that one more question would be taken from the microphone on the right, as seen from the stage. Meyer grabbed a second microphone, which had been shut off, and demanded he be allowed to ask a question, asking, "Why don't you answer my questions? I have been waiting and listening to you speak in circles for the last two hours." He also stated, "These officers are going to arrest me," and "You will take my question because I have been listening to your crap for two hours." When an officer attempted to cut Meyer off and escort him out of the hall, Meyer broke away and continued to shout. Kerry then intervened and requested that Meyer be allowed to ask a question. Meyer was then brought back to the microphone with police officers on either side of him.

Meyer then handed his camera to the woman who was standing in line in front of him and requested that she record him. After Kerry completed answering a prior question, Meyer was acknowledged by Kerry to pose his question.

=== Video begins ===
Meyer's video begins with him speaking for approximately 1 minute and 20 seconds. He starts by citing the book Armed Madhouse and its author Greg Palast's description of the 2004 U.S. presidential election and reports of election irregularities. According to The Washington Post, Meyer's question turned into "an increasingly agitated three-parter".

Meyer questioned Kerry's concession of the 2004 U.S. presidential election, Kerry's support or lack of support of the efforts to impeach George W. Bush, and Kerry's involvement in the Yale University secret society known as Skull and Bones. After Meyer used the term "blowjob" (in reference to the impeachment of Bill Clinton) and while he was asking about Kerry's involvement in Skull and Bones, Meyer's microphone was cut off. Later, Steven Blank, ACCENT chairman, said, "We make it clear that any profanity and vulgarity by anyone asking questions will result in a cutting off of the mic."

=== Removal and arrest ===
After Meyer's microphone was turned off, two University of Florida police officers attempted to take him away and arrest him. Steven Blank, ACCENT chairman, later said that the police "acted independently of ACCENT." Some members of the crowd began to cheer and applaud. Physical contact by the police occurred right after Meyer remarked, "Thank you for cutting my mic!" Kerry responded to the police action, "That's all right, let me answer his question," but two police officers continued to hold Meyer and attempted to forcibly move him towards the exit. Meyer repeatedly asked why he was being arrested. He struggled for several seconds shouting, "Get off me! What are you doing? What is going on?" while a third police officer kept a Taser aimed at him. Meyer managed to get back towards the stage and stated, "I want to stand and listen to the answers to my questions!" A fourth officer joined in, and single-handedly removed Meyer to the back of the auditorium while being escorted by the three other officers. Meyer was carried part of the way by officer King, holding Greg Palast's book up in the air with his one free arm and shouting, "Why are you arresting me? Help! Help!" Close to the exit, Meyer broke free for a short moment and then was wrestled to the ground. Two more officers joined in and Meyer was now held down by four officers on the body and two on the legs. The officers only handcuffed one hand.

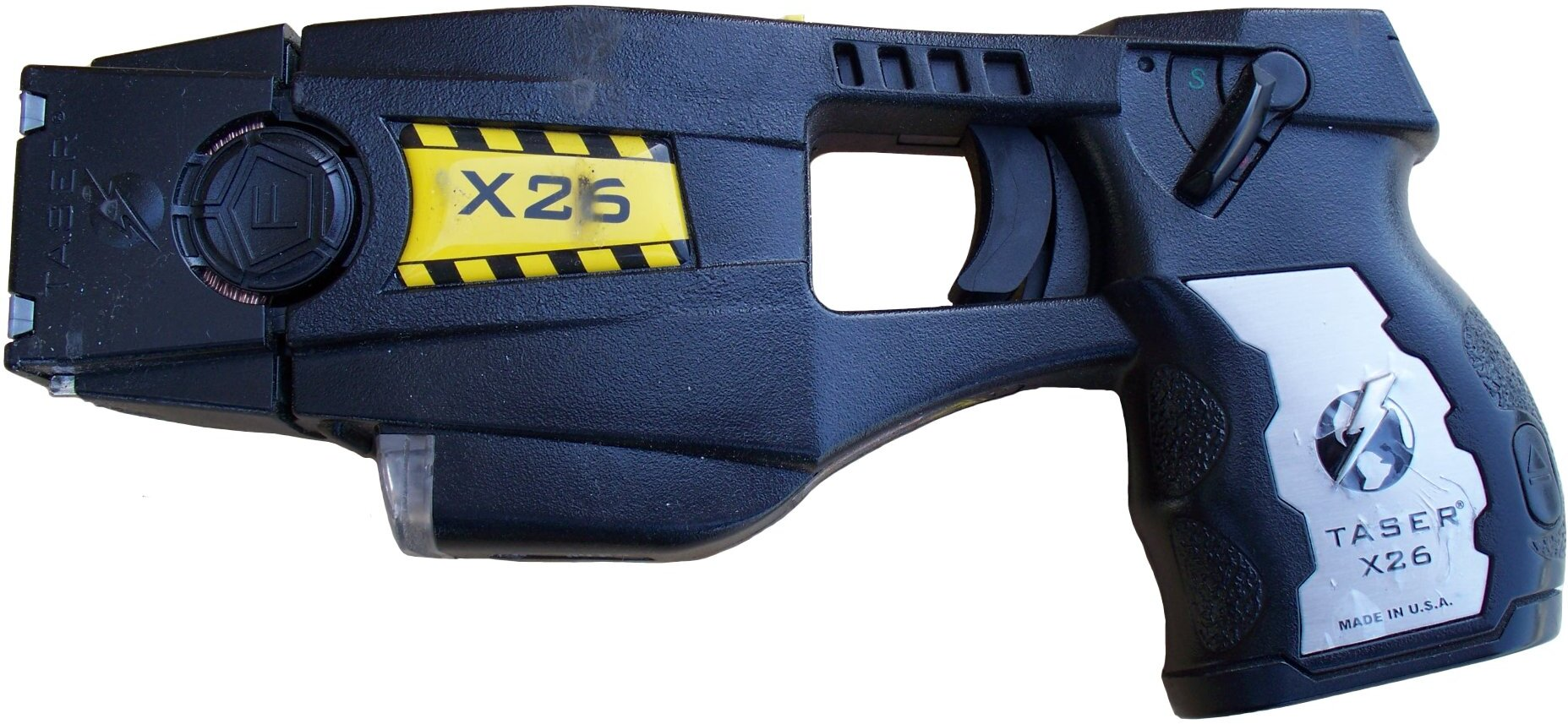
An X-26 taser, like the one used by Officer Mallo on Meyer.

As Meyer requested to be allowed to leave of his own accord, they informed him that he no longer had a say in the matter and threatened several times to tase him if he did not comply with arrest. Meyer asked again to leave, and he yelled "Don't tase me, bro! Don't tase me!" but was drive-stunned (referred to in the police report as a "contact tase") in the shoulder by an officer with a department-issued X-26 Taser when he failed to comply.

I managed to take control of Meyer's right hand and restrain it into one side of my handcuffs. Due to Meyer's erratic flailing, the inability to attain Meyer's left arm from his resistance, and increased potential for injury with one cuff on, Sgt. King attempted to deploy a contact tase to no avail. He then instructed [Officer] Mallo to apply a contact tase to gain compliance in order to place Meyer's left hand into the other cuff. Mallo gave verbal commands and informed Meyer that he would be tased if he did not comply. Once Mallo applied the tase, Wise assisted Meyer's left arm to where I was able to apply the other cuff. Once he was restrained, he was escorted out of the Auditorium where I checked the fitting and applied the double-locked function on the cuffs.

— Police Report, Statement of Officer Pablo De Jesus, Jr.,

Meyer continued screaming for help as the officers removed him from the room. During the altercation, Kerry urged everyone to calm down, saying that "Unfortunately, [Meyer] is not available to come up here and swear me in as President" and continued his response to Meyer's question, which he referred to as "very important". Senator Kerry later released a statement saying that he was unaware that any tasing had occurred until afterwards.

Meyer was then escorted off the premises and detained overnight in the Alachua County Jail. A large gathering of students protested outside the jail that evening.

=== Legal action ===
After the incident, Meyer was arrested for inciting a riot and charged with resisting an officer and disturbing the peace and taken to Alachua County Jail. Meyer spent one night in the jail and was released the following morning. Police recommended charges of resisting arrest with violence, a felony, and disturbing the peace and interfering with school administrative functions, a misdemeanor.

Meyer's attorney, Robert S. Griscti, stated he would seek to have the charges dismissed. Meyer later issued a public apology for his "failure to act calmly", stating that he "stepped out of line". He initially insisted there was no reason for his arrest and demanded an apology from the Alachua County Police Department, although he sent written letters of apology to the University Police Department, as well as UF President Machen and the Gator Community. The state attorney agreed to drop prosecution of Meyer's case in return for Meyer serving a voluntary 18-month probation. If Meyer got into legal trouble during the probationary period, he was to be charged for the September 17 incident with resisting officers without violence and interfering with a school function. According to the University of Florida, Meyer also accepted sanctions from the university for violations of the Student Code of Conduct. The sanctions were not made public because of student privacy laws. He returned as a student in the spring semester of 2008.

== Issues raised ==
=== Allegations of excessive force ===
CNN reported that student opinions on the University of Florida campus were evenly divided as to whether the officers acted properly. The day following this incident, about 300 students marched to the steps of campus police headquarters the following day with another 100 marching to Emerson Alumni Hall. They chanted that police used excessive force and waved signs that read "Stop police brutality", "Taze Pigs", "Freedom of Speech not a Felony", "Tasers Kill", and Meyer's words, "Don't Tase me, bro." They demanded that tasers be banned from campus and that charges be filed against the police officers who restrained and tased Meyer. Four weeks after the incident, the university sponsored a panel to discuss appropriate police practices. Fifteen people attended and one signed up to make comments.

=== Free speech issues ===
Some critics of the police action here have suggested that it was not Meyer's actions which led to his removal, but the content of his remarks. For example, writer Palast said, "When you bring up uncomfortable stuff, it's going to create discomfort. Obviously, if he was speaking about baseball scores—if he maybe had a different political viewpoint that wasn't seen as combative or outside of what's permissible—then the cops' backs wouldn't have been up."

The American Civil Liberties Union's Florida chapter released a statement on September 18, 2007, expressing dismay over the incident.

"Apart from the taser use issues, one must consider the free speech implications of the police officers' actions", said Howard Simon, ACLU of Florida Executive Director. "People have a reasonable expectation to ask questions in a public setting – even if they are aggressive and some disagree with their position – that is free speech plain and simple. Similarly – Kerry had a reasonable expectation to be able to answer those questions. Neither of them was able to exercise their free speech rights due to the police action.

=== Versions of the incident ===
Various news articles speculated that the incident was a stunt by Meyer, noting that he would post comedy videos on his personal website and arrange to have himself filmed by others. The reports also cited Meyer's behavior when no cameras were present as evidence that the incident was a prank. The police report claimed that "as [Meyer] was escorted [downstairs] with no cameras in sight, he remained quiet, but once the cameras made their way [downstairs] he started screaming and yelling again." Additionally, the report asserts that Meyer was "laughing and being lighthearted in the car, his demeanor completely changed once the cameras were not in sight." The police officers involved in the arrest claimed that during the ride, Meyer said: "I am not mad at you guys, you didn't do anything wrong, you were just trying to do your job."

John Levy, a graduate student at the university and a friend of Meyer's since the second grade, said that he spoke with Meyer shortly before he entered the Kerry forum. Levy said that Meyer felt excited, had come up with several questions, and wanted to hear the senator's responses. Levy also said that Meyer was "really upset that people are more concerned with the police attack and not with the dialogue he was trying to start with Kerry" and that he asked Levy "What kind of message does that send? He wants to show students it's okay to ask hard questions, and then he gets tased for doing it." This sentiment was strongly echoed by filmmaker John Ennis and Greg Palast (the author of the book Meyer was holding during the event) in the 2008 film Free For All. When "asked about speculation that Meyer staged the confrontation", University spokesman Steve Orlando has stated that a member of the Office of Student Affairs told Orlando that Meyer brought a video camera to the forum and gave it to Clarissa Jessup, the young woman who was next in line to ask a question, with whom he was unacquainted, before he spoke. Henry Perlstein, a university senior who has known Meyer since high school, said, "My first impression was that [the video] was a home movie he made for his friends because it was so surreal. Then I heard the screams and he sounded genuinely afraid." Amos Eshel, a fellow UF student who has known Meyer since middle school and who attended his arraignment in September 2007, later told reporters that Meyer does "like to speak his mind" but that Meyer is not the type of person who would attempt to start trouble.

=== University investigation ===
On September 18, in Emerson Alumni Hall, then-UF President J. Bernard Machen held a press conference about the incident. He also issued a letter in which he stated that the University Police Chief Linda Stump had requested that the Florida Department of Law Enforcement (FDLE) investigate the arrest. President Machen stated that "We plan to assemble a panel of faculty and students to review our police protocols, our management practices and the FDLE report to come up with a series of recommendations for the university." The State Attorney's Office will review the charges as well.

The Miami Herald stated that, at the press conference, President Machen called the situation "regretful for us" and announced that two officers involved in the incident had been placed on paid administrative leave pending the outcome of the probe. University spokesman Steve Orlando said Meyer was asked to leave the microphone after his allotted time was up. However, a transcript of the event shows that this is untrue; he was not told to leave at any point. The university president "would not say whether he thought the latest episode was a prank."

On October 24, the FDLE released a report on its investigation of the incident. The report concluded that Meyer may have planned a 'disruption' of the forum. It also cleared the police officers involved of any wrongdoing in subduing Meyer, saying that the officer's actions were justified. University President Bernie Machen stated that "I have full confidence in the police department" and that the two officers previously placed on paid administrative leave have been fully reinstated.

=== Response from Senator Kerry ===
On the day following the incident, Kerry's office issued a statement:

In 37 years of public appearances, through wars, protests and highly emotional events, I have never had a dialogue end this way. I believe I could have handled the situation without interruption, but I do not know what warnings or other exchanges transpired between the young man and the police prior to his barging to the front of the line and their intervention. I asked the police to allow me to answer the question and was in the process of responding when he was taken into custody. I was not aware that a taser was used until after I left the building. I hope that neither the student nor any of the police were injured. I regret enormously that a good healthy discussion was interrupted.

— John Kerry

== Popular culture ==
The most viewed video of the taser incident, shot by Kyle Mitchell of The Gainesville Sun, has more than 8 million views on YouTube as of October 2023. The "Don't tase me, bro!" quote has become a catchphrase and Internet meme, spawning various parodies of the incident. The New Oxford American Dictionary listed "tase/taze" as one of the words of the year for 2007. The Yale Book of Quotations designated Meyer's exclamation as the most memorable quote of 2007. Time selected the video as one of YouTube's 50 Best Videos in March 2010.

== See also ==
- Taser safety issues
- Taser International – Taser Manufacturer
- Braidwood Inquiry – Official Canadian enquiry into Tasers and similar devices
- UCLA Taser incident
- Killing of Robert Dziekański
- Student protest
