= UCLA Taser incident =

- Date: November 14, 2006
- Time: 11:30 p.m.
- Location: University of California, Los Angeles, Los Angeles, California, U.S.
- Cause: Shocked by a Taser
- Participants: Terrence Duren, Alexis Bicomong, Kevin Kilgore, Andrew Ikeda (officers); Mostafa Tabatabainejad (detainee)
- Injuries: Mostafa Tabatabainejad
- Litigation: Tabatabainejad filed a lawsuit against UCLA; settled for $220,000

On November 14, 2006, Mostafa Tabatabainejad, a fourth-year University of California, Los Angeles (UCLA) student, was drive stunned five times with a Taser by campus police while handcuffed.

Tabatabainejad allegedly refused to show his school ID to a fellow student acting as security at the college library Instructional Computing Commons (CLICC) lab at Powell Library during finals week. The student instead asked the community officer if he had asked anyone else that evening to show their ID.

The community officer threatened to call campus police if he didn't show ID. Tabatabainejad, being confident the campus police would take his side as he felt he was being harassed and singled out because of his Middle Eastern ethnicity, invited the community officer to do so.

When the campus police arrived they did not ask questions but instead handcuffed Tabatabainejad and attempted to physically remove him from the library. Tabatabainejad sat on the floor in protest of the way he was being treated at his own university while he was studying for final exams. The campus police then tasered him five times while his hands were bound behind his back with plastic wrist restraints. Part of the incident was recorded on video by a camera phone and is available for viewing on YouTube.

Tabatabainejad, an Iranian-American of Muslim heritage, said through his lawyers that he refused to identify himself because he believed himself a victim of racial profiling and that the tasing was an instance of police brutality. Tabatabainejad filed a federal lawsuit alleging that the officers used excessive force and that they violated the Americans with Disabilities Act. The case was settled on May 15, 2009, with UCLA agreeing to pay $220,000.

== Incident ==
At approximately 11:30 p.m. on November 14, 2006, Community Service Officers were conducting routine checks of students' BruinCard IDs in Powell Library. UCPD Assistant Chief of Police Jeff Young said the checks are a standard procedure in the 24-hour library after 11:00 p.m., when use of the library is restricted to staff, faculty and students.

When Tabatabainejad refused to produce university identification, he was asked to leave the premises. When Tabatabainejad failed to leave, UCPD officers were called to the scene, arriving approximately 10 minutes later. Following a confrontation, the officers used the Taser repeatedly, then told him to stand up.

Tabatabainejad was released from custody after being given a citation for obstruction/delay of a peace officer in the performance of duty. According to a press release issued by the UCPD, he was also issued a court date.

=== Officers ===
Terrence Duren, a former Marine and 18-year veteran of the UCLA Police Department, tasered Tabatabainejad multiple times. Duren had been the subject of other use-of-force complaints and had been previously recommended for dismissal. In an October 2003 incident, Duren shot and wounded a homeless man in a university building, a case that went to trial. In May 1990, Duren was accused of using his nightstick to choke Kente S. Scott, who was idling in front of a fraternity late on a Saturday night. Scott sued, and the university moved to have Duren removed from the force but later gave him a 90-day suspension. Duren stated that all of the past allegations against him regarding police misconduct and use of excessive force were investigated by the UCPD and proven false. (Note: The homeless man was convicted of assaulting an officer.) Prior to the UCLA Taser Incident, several grassroots campaigns between 2002-2006 were undertaken by UCLA students to educate the student body in regard to Duren's history of excessive force. The campaigns were initiated by distinct parties in response to Duren's aggressive behavior for pedestrian citations. Prior to joining the UCPD in the late 1980s, Duren was fired from the Long Beach Police Department due to "poor report-writing skills and geographical knowledge." Following the tasering incident, Duren remained on active duty. Duren was named 2001 UCLA Officer of the Year by the University of California Police Department. Also on the scene were Officers Alexis Bicomong, Kevin Kilgore, and Andrew Ikeda.

=== Video and eyewitness accounts ===
Part of the event is recorded in a six-minute cell phone video recorded by another student. The video has been widely disseminated online, and an edited version is available on the Daily Bruin site. Tabatabainejad is first heard (though not seen) repeatedly shouting "Don't touch me!" to the officers. Over the course of the video, he is stunned multiple times, while officers repeatedly order him to stand up and stop fighting, and threaten to administer further stuns. Tabatabainejad repeatedly states that he is not fighting and that he will leave the premises. He shouts that he has a medical condition, and shouts "Here's your PATRIOT Act! Here's your fucking abuse of power!" Witnesses say that when it was clear none of the other students were going to help him, Tabatabainejad said "Am I the only martyr?" According to one witness, "[Tabatabainejad was] no possible danger to any of the police. [He was] getting shocked and tasered as he was handcuffed." Bystanders can be heard demanding the officers' names and badge numbers, and shouting for them to stop using the Taser on Tabatabainejad; numerous times these officers responded to demands of their badge numbers with phrases such as "do you want to get tased too?"

At one point, the officers told the crowd to stand back and threatened to tase anyone who approached too closely. A female student said that the officers threatened to tase her when she asked an officer for his name and badge number. According to an ACLU attorney, such a threat of force in response to a badge number request constitutes illegal assault. At 6:36 in the video, an officer tells a male student, "Get back over there or you're going to get tased, too."

A press release issued by the UCPD claims that the officers "asked Tabatabainejad to leave the premises multiple times", and that Tabatabainejad refused to leave. Witnesses dispute this account, saying that Tabatabainejad had begun to walk toward the door with his backpack when an officer approached him and grabbed his arm, whereupon Tabatabainejad told the officer several times to let go.

Tabatabainejad has said through his lawyers that he was stunned five times, which is the count reported in the media immediately after the incident. The reported count was reduced to three after the release of the independent report.

The independent report clarifies:

It is our understanding that Tabatabainejad remembers being tased on at least four or five occasions. Officer 2 [Duren] notes at the conclusion of his initial report that "it's possible that I may have tased Tabatabainejad a 4th time, but I am unsure at which time this may have occurred." Various media accounts following the incident reported the common assumption from several students that Tabatabainejad "was hit with a Taser five times when he did not leave." Accordingly, we cannot rule out the possibility that Tabatabainejad was tased more than the three discrete times that we have identified and confirmed. Still, we note that the internal recording system in the X26 Taser is considered by most law enforcement personnel to be reliable, and we have no reason to believe that its record of three Taser firings is inaccurate.

== Official response ==
According to the UCPD press release from soon after the incident, "Tabatabainejad went limp and refused to exit as the officers attempted to escort him out." The release also states that Tabatabainejad "encouraged library patrons to join his resistance." At this point, the officers "deemed it necessary to use the Taser in a 'Drive Stun' capacity".

In a statement released November 15, 2006, the day after the incident, Acting Chancellor Norman Abrams said:

Investigators are reviewing the incident and the officers' actions. The investigation and review will be thorough, vigorous and fair. The safety of our campus community is of paramount importance to me. Routinely checking student identification after 11 p.m. at the campus library, which is open 24 hours, is a policy posted in the library that was enacted for the protection of our students. Compliance is critical for the safety and well-being of everyone.

On November 17, 2006, a press conference was held by Abrams and UCPD Chief Karl Ross, during which it was announced that the UCPD was planning to conduct an independent investigation into the incident led by Merrick Bobb, president of the Police Assessment Resource Center.

On November 18, 2006, Iran's Foreign Ministry spokesman Mohammad-Ali Hosseini condemned the incident, and urged punishment for those responsible.

On August 1, 2007, the results of the internal and independent investigations were released, nine months after the incident. The independent investigation found a number of policy violations, but the internal investigation found none. According to Abrams's statement, the difference in conclusions "is not unusual in the legal system. Reasonable people may disagree regarding the inferences to be drawn from the same set of facts, and the facts may differ if some witnesses testify in one investigation and not in the other." The internal investigation is confidential, but the full independent report is available for review.

On December 10, 2007, the UCLA Police Department released its new policy governing Taser use. The policy was developed from recommendations made in the independent report and with input from experts on Tasers and police use-of-force policy. School administrators and student leaders were asked to review and comment on the policy before it was finalized.

== Community response ==
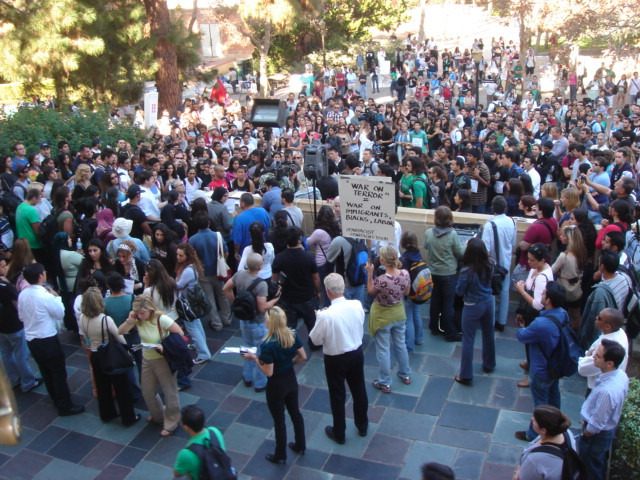
Student news conference on taser incident, November 17, 2006.

On November 17, 2006, 400 protesters, including UCLA faculty and staff, parents, community members, and UCLA students, gathered at Kerckhoff Hall to protest against the incident. This was followed by a march to the UCPD police station, where protesters were met by officers in riot gear.

The protest was organized by more than fifty student organizations to demand an independent investigation into the incident, and to demand the inclusion of students in the investigation.

Combiz Abdolrahimi, one of the protest organizers, said that the chancellor should appoint students who will be able to make sure the investigation is transparent and campus police reforms are carried out to protect the students and ensure their safety. He also called for justice and the officers to be held accountable.

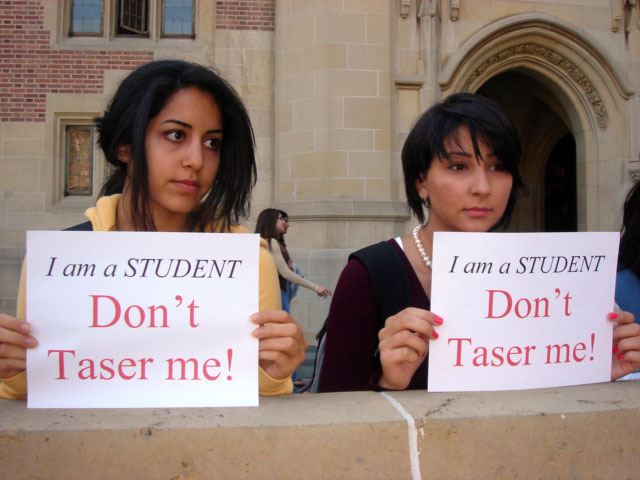
Students protest taser incident, November 17, 2006.

On the same day as the protest, Abrams announced an independent investigation in addition to the internal investigation.

On November 18, 2006, the University of California Students Association passed a "Police Brutality Resolution" regarding recent incidents at UC Santa Cruz and UCLA. A Daily Bruin editorial criticized the UCLA portion of the resolution, describing it as "full of inaccuracies".

On November 21, 2006, the UCLA Undergraduate Students Association Council passed a resolution "opposing inappropriate force against students by university police".

== Lawsuit ==
Tabatabainejad's former lawyer, Stephen Yagman, announced on November 17, 2006 that he planned to file a lawsuit against university police alleging "brutal excessive force" and false arrest. According to Yagman, Tabatabainejad was asked to show his university identification card and did not do so because he believed he was being singled out for racial profiling. Yagman, who characterized the incident as an example of police brutality, claimed Tabatabainejad was the only person who was asked to show ID. A November 22, 2006 article in the Los Angeles Times reported that Yagman had said on November 21 that he was no longer representing Tabatabainejad.

On January 17, 2007, Tabatabainejad filed a federal lawsuit alleging the campus officers used excessive force, and that they violated the Americans with Disabilities Act of 1990. He was seeking unspecified damages. According to the lawsuit, Tabatabainejad has bipolar disorder and informed the officers of his condition, but was treated in a way that constitutes discrimination under the ADA. His attorney, Paul Hoffman, said that a February 2008 court date had been set. On May 15, 2009, UCLA announced that the university would pay $220,000 to settle the civil rights lawsuit.

== UCPD policy on Taser use ==
The UCLA PD policy in effect at the time of the incident calls the Taser a "less lethal device" and says that "although not absolutely prohibited, officers should give additional consideration to the unique circumstances involved prior to applying the Taser to ... Individuals who are handcuffed or otherwise restrained" (4C). According to the policy, the "Drive Stun" capacity is appropriate "to eliminate physical resistance from an arrestee in accomplishing an arrest or physical search" (6A) as well as "pain compliance against passive resistors" (6B).

Of the ten UC campus police departments, six have equipped officers with Tasers, but only UCLA had a flexible policy authorizing Tasers to be used as a pain-compliance tool against suspects who are passively resisting.

The UCLA PD released its new Taser policy on December 10, 2007. According to UCPD Chief Karl Ross, the new policy is considerably longer, includes specific definitions of appropriate and inappropriate use, and explicitly prohibits use against a "passive resister".

== See also ==
- Taser safety issues
- Taser International - Taser manufacturer
- Braidwood Inquiry - Official Canadian inquiry into Tasers and similar devices
- University of Florida Taser incident
- Killing of Robert Dziekański
