= Killing of Robert Dziekański =

2007 police killing at Vancouver Airport

- RCMP officers taser a handcuffed and pinned Dziekański minutes before his death at Vancouver International Airport.
- Date: October 14, 2007
- Time: 1:28 AM PDT
- Location: Vancouver International Airport, Richmond, British Columbia, Canada
- Deaths: 1

On October 14, 2007, Robert Dziekański (Polish pronunciation: [ˈrɔbɛrd d͡ʑɛˈkaj̃skʲi]), a 40-year-old Polish man in the process of immigrating to Canada, was killed while being detained at the Vancouver International Airport in Richmond, British Columbia.

During customs processing, Dziekański began showing frustration and agitation towards airport staff. When members of the Royal Canadian Mounted Police (RCMP) encountered him in the international reception lounge at the airport, they pinned, handcuffed and used a Taser electroshock weapon on Dziekański multiple times—with accounts suggesting the weapon was used four or five times. Dziekański died at the scene from a heart attack induced by the electrical shocks.

Video of the incident was recorded by an eyewitness, Paul Pritchard. The police initially took possession of the memory card containing the video as evidence, stating it would compromise the investigation if it were released to the public at that time. However, the following month, Pritchard was able to re-obtain the video, and sold it to the press—which brought additional prominence to the case. The final inquiry report, released on June 18, 2010, concluded that the RCMP were not justified in using a taser against Dziekański, and that the officers later deliberately misrepresented their actions to investigators. The four officers involved were charged with perjury and in 2015, two of the defendants were cleared of all charges while the remaining two were sentenced to twenty-four to thirty months in prison.

== Incident ==
Robert Dziekański was a construction worker by trade, but had also worked as a miner. He was in the process of emigrating from Gliwice, Poland, to live with his mother, Zofia Cisowski, in Kamloops, British Columbia.

Dziekański's flight was two hours late, and arrived at about 3:15 p.m on October 13, 2007. According to official sources, he required language support to complete initial customs formalities. After a primary immigration inspection, Dziekański was directed to go to the airport's secondary immigration area for further processing. However, it is unclear whether he followed this instruction. Instead, he was seen walking along the terminal and standing near the baggage carousels at various times between 4:00 p.m. and about 10:45 p.m. Dziekański's mother, Zofia Cisowski, had told him to wait for her at the baggage claim area, but this was a secured area where she was not allowed to enter. At 10:45 p.m., when he attempted to leave the customs hall, he was directed again to secondary immigration to begin processing his immigration papers. Dziekański's immigration procedures were completed at about 12:15 a.m. on October 14. After 30 minutes in an immigration waiting area, he was taken to the international arrivals reception area. Cisowski had been making enquiries of airport staff since the early afternoon. Airport staff told her Dziekański was not at the airport and she had returned to Kamloops at about 10 p.m., believing her son had missed his flight.

When Dziekański left the customs hall, he became visibly agitated. Bystanders and airport security guards were unable to communicate with him because he did not speak English. He used chairs to prop open the one-way doors between a customs clearing area and a public lounge and at one point threw a computer and a small table to the floor before the police arrived. Four RCMP officers, constables Gerry Rundel, Bill Bentley, Kwesi Millington, and a supervisor, Corporal Benjamin Robinson, arrived and entered the customs room where Dziekański was pacing about. They apparently directed him to stand near a counter, to which Dziekański complied but then he picked up a stapler sometime after being told to place his hands on a counter.

Shortly thereafter, about 25 seconds after arriving at the scene, Corporal Robinson ordered the Taser to be used. Constable Millington tasered Dziekański. He began to convulse and was tasered several more times after falling to the ground, where the four officers pinned, handcuffed, and continued to taser him. One eyewitness, who recorded the incident on her cellphone, told CBC News that Dziekański had been tasered four times. "The third and fourth ones were at the same time" delivered by the officers at Dziekański's right and left, just before Dziekański fell. According to BC Crown counsel spokesman Stan Lowe, Dziekański was tasered a total of five times. Constable Millington testified that he deployed the Taser four times, but he believed that in some of those instances the probes may not have contacted Dziekański's body. Dziekański writhed and screamed before he stopped moving. Corporal Robinson stated he then checked for a pulse, but his heart had stopped. Testimony from the other RCMP officers stated they never saw anyone, including Robinson, check for a pulse. Dziekański did not receive CPR until paramedics arrived on the scene approximately 15 minutes later. Paramedics attempted resuscitation for 20 minutes; they were unable to revive him, and he was pronounced dead at the scene.

In 2013, the BC Coroners Service ruled the death to be a homicide, citing a heart attack caused by the repeated jolts.

== Controversy ==
=== Video ===
October 14, 2007: Screenshot from video taken by Paul Pritchard showing Robert Dziekański shortly after being tasered by RCMP officers at Vancouver airport.

The entire event was recorded by Paul Pritchard, another traveler who was at the airport. Pritchard handed his camera and the video to police who told him that they would return the video within 48 hours. Instead, they returned the camera with a new memory card and kept the original with the video, saying they needed it to preserve the integrity of the investigation. They claimed witness statements would be tainted if they viewed the video evidence before being interviewed by police. Pritchard went to court to obtain the video, which he then released to the media on November 14, 2007; three television outlets paid fees to Pritchard for the right to broadcast the video. After the video was made available, an RCMP spokesperson cautioned the public to reserve judgment about the police because the video represented "just one small piece of evidence, one person's view."

Before the video was released, the RCMP repeatedly claimed that only three officers were at the scene. There were actually four. The RCMP also said that they did not use pepper spray because of the risk it would have posed to bystanders. The video, however, suggested the incident occurred in an area separated from bystanders by a glass wall. The incident occurred inside the international arrivals area, which is separated by glass. Those waiting to greet arriving international passengers could view the area from the waiting lounge on the other side of the glass. An RCMP spokesperson stated that batons were not used, which was contradicted by the video.

=== Criticism of the RCMP ===
The RCMP officers involved in the Dziekański death, constables Gerry Rundel, Bill Bentley, Kwesi Millington, and supervisor Corporal Benjamin Robinson, have been widely criticized for their handling of the incident. A retired Vancouver Police superintendent commented after viewing the video that Dziekański did not appear to be making "any threatening gestures" towards the police and he did not see why it became a police incident. Particularly contentious is that the RCMP officers made no attempt to defuse or gain control of the situation before resorting to the Taser.

In August 2007, before Dziekański's death, RCMP changed its protocol on Taser use, suggesting that multiple Taser shocks may be appropriate under certain circumstances.

The RCMP's handling of the incident led to charges that they misrepresented the facts. The BC Civil Liberties Association filed a complaint in 2007 arguing that the evidence shows that the Taser was not used as a last resort and condemning the RCMP for its attempt to suppress the video and for casting aspersions on the character of Dziekański. An RCMP spokesman, Sergeant Pierre Lemaitre, was heavily criticized for providing a false version of events prior to the public release of the video. He stated that Dziekański "continued to throw things around and yell and scream", after the arrival of the police officers, which was later revealed by the video to be false. Sergeant Lemaitre committed suicide in 2013 due to his involvement in the case, according to his wife, who alleged he was made a pariah and demoted by the RCMP. His wife said Lemaitre was merely providing the facts he was given, and was prevented from correcting his public statements after he found out the truth.

On December 12, 2008, the Criminal Justice Branch of British Columbia issued a statement, finding that although the RCMP officers' efforts to restrain Dziekański were a contributing cause of his death, the force they used to subdue and restrain him was reasonable and necessary in all circumstances; thus there would not be a substantial likelihood of conviction of the officers in connection with the incident and accordingly criminal charges were not approved. Three of the officers remained on duty elsewhere in Canada, while the supervisor, Corporal Benjamin "Monty" Robinson, resigned from the force on July 20, 2012, prior to a sentencing hearing after being found guilty of obstruction of justice stemming from a vehicle collision that resulted in the death of a 21-year-old Vancouver man.

The officers have been subject to criticism, both in the media and in formal proceedings before the Braidwood Commission of Inquiry. The officers were served notices of misconduct by the commission forewarning them the commissioner may include a finding of misconduct in its final report. The warnings allege specific but overlapping grounds for each of the four. The collective allegations are that they failed to properly assess and respond to the circumstances in which they found Dziekański. They repeatedly deployed the taser without justification and separately failed to adequately reassess the situation before further deploying it. The notices allege that afterwards they misrepresented facts in notes and statements, furthered the misrepresenting before the commission and provided further misleading information about other evidence before the commission. The four officers each sought judicial review to prevent the commission from making findings based on the notices. The petitions were dismissed. Three of the officers appealed and lost. In July 2013 one of the three officers was cleared of perjury. The remaining two officers stood trial in 2014.

On February 20, 2015, Constable Kwesi Millington, the RCMP officer who fired the Taser on the night Robert Dziekański died eight years previously, was found guilty of perjury and colluding with his fellow officers before testifying at the inquiry into Dziekański's death, and on June 22, 2015, was sentenced to 30 months in prison.

=== Taser debate ===
The incident has revived debate concerning police use of Tasers. This was the 16th death following the police use of Tasers in Canada since 2003 and civil liberties groups have called for a moratorium on Tasers until training and procedures can be developed and implemented to minimize the risks. The human rights group Amnesty International repeated its call for Taser use to be suspended until an independent investigation into the medical and other effects has taken place. Meanwhile, Canada's seventeenth Taser-related death occurred less than a week later when Quilem Registre died after being tasered by police in Montreal.

The police and the manufacturer have claimed that such deaths are the result of pre-existing medical conditions, not the electrical shock of the Taser. In the Vancouver case, police have suggested that Dziekański died from a condition described as "excited delirium." A statement from TASER International, the company that makes the weapon, asserts that Dziekański's death "appears to follow the pattern of many in-custody deaths following a confrontation with the police. Historically, medical science and forensic analysis has shown that these deaths are attributable to other factors and not the low-energy electrical discharge of the Taser."

Critics, however, point out that "excited delirium" is not recognized in the Diagnostic and Statistical Manual of Mental Disorders and claim that police overuse such so-called conditions as a matter of convenience. Experts say that delirium (without the "excited" modifier) is a well-known condition, but that it is usually triggered by factors such as drugs or a pronounced mental or physical illness and that it is extremely rare for those afflicted to suddenly die. Toxicology tests found no drugs or alcohol in Dziekański's system. An autopsy for the British Columbia Coroner's Service did not determine the cause of death, citing no trauma or disease, but noted that Dziekański had signs of chronic alcohol abuse such as atrophy of a portion of the brain, cardiomyopathy and fatty liver. The report by forensic pathologist Charles Lee, of Vancouver General Hospital, listed the principal cause of death as "sudden death during restraint", with a contributory factor of "chronic alcoholism".

=== Criticism of airport ===
The airport has also been criticized over the incident, particularly regarding security cameras that were not functioning, no translation services available for communicating with non-English speakers, the airport supervisor's failure to call the airport's own paramedics resulting in a twelve-minute wait for city paramedics to arrive, and for staff not helping Dziekański's mother find her son.

Airport security has been roundly criticized for not assisting Dziekański during his many hours in the airport. Once he became agitated, security guards made little attempt to communicate with him or defuse the situation.

The Canada Border Services Agency reported it is reviewing its procedures at airports.

=== Polish reaction ===
The incident has had significant coverage in Poland. The Polish consul general demanded answers about Dziekański's death. Piotr Ogrodziński, the Polish ambassador in Ottawa, stated: "The video does not give us a clear recording of what he was shouting but what I have heard in Polish is the beginning … Pol, which could be either policja — in other words calling for police — or pomocy, which in Polish means help". Canada's ambassador in Poland was invited to discuss the incident with officials in Warsaw, and one Polish official stated in the weeks after the incident that "we want the matter clarified and we want those guilty named and punished."

On December 12, 2008, the Polish embassy in Ottawa issued a statement stating that the Crown's decision not to charge the RCMP officers was "most disappointing".

In February 2009, it was reported that Canada had unilaterally suspended its mutual legal assistance treaty with Poland, thus blocking Poland's own investigation of the Dziekański Taser incident.

=== Reaction in Parliament ===
Canada's then Minister of Public Safety, Stockwell Day, said that he had asked the RCMP for a review on Taser use and that a report was being prepared, and pointed out that several investigations of the incident were already underway. Liberal public safety critic Ujjal Dosanjh said that what was needed was an independent body to conduct a national and public review of the issue, which would lead to national guidelines for Taser use by law enforcement officers. BC New Democratic Party Public Safety Critic and Port Coquitlam MLA Mike Farnworth called for a special prosecutor to be appointed to investigate the incident, citing concerns of police investigating themselves.

=== Law enforcement response ===
The response from law enforcement was mixed. Law enforcement professionals have featured prominently in the media criticizing RCMP handling of the situation and the aftermath. The Ottawa Police, the first Ontario police force to adopt the Taser, held a Taser demonstration for reporters to illustrate their safety. Both the Toronto Police and the Royal Newfoundland Constabulary, meanwhile, put large orders of Tasers for their front-line officers on hold.

== Investigation ==
=== Braidwood Inquiry (2008–2010) ===
The Braidwood Inquiry was established by the Government of British Columbia and headed by retired Court of Appeal of British Columbia and Court of Appeal of Yukon Justice Thomas R. Braidwood to "inquire into and report on the use of conducted energy weapons" and to "inquire into and report on the death of Mr. Dziekanski." After two delays, the Braidwood Commission began proceedings in February 2008, investigating the circumstances surrounding Dziekański's death. Commission counsel Art Vertlieb said that the involved RCMP officers, Constable Millington, Constable Bentley, Constable Rundel, and Corporal Robinson, would be summoned to appear before the inquiry and could face findings of misconduct. Constable Gerry Rundel and Constable Bill Bentley testified at the Inquiry the week of February 23, 2009, and Constable Kwesi Millington testified there the following week. The fourth and supervising RCMP officer, Corporal Benjamin Robinson, testified beginning March 23, 2009.

Commissioner Braidwood made criminal allegations against the four Mounties. The Mounties' counsel thought he had no such power and launched a lawsuit in the B.C. Supreme Court; this was ultimately unsuccessful.

On 18 June 2010 the long-awaited Braidwood report was released. It concluded the RCMP were not justified in using the Taser, and that the officers later deliberately misrepresented their actions to investigators. Braidwood said he would leave any further questions about possible charges against the officers for the Crown to decide, and added:

This tragic case is at its heart a story of shameful conduct by a few officers. It ought not to reflect unfairly on the many thousands of RCMP and other police officers who have, through years of public service, protected our communities and earned a well-deserved reputation for doing so.

As there had now been a public inquiry, the Chief Coroner for British Columbia decided against holding an inquest into Dziekański's death.

=== Criminal charges and convictions (2010–2017) ===
On June 29, 2010, and prodded by the Braidwood findings, special prosecutor Richard Peck released an opinion there was sufficient new evidence to reopen the investigation into conduct of the four RCMP officers. The province's Criminal Justice Branch had decided in December 2008 not to charge the officers, saying their use of force was reasonable in the circumstances, but Peck said the inquiry unearthed new evidence and he recommended that the decision not to lay charges should be revisited.

All four Mounties were charged with perjury as a result of the Braidwood Inquiry. Their cases were tried separately.

On June 22, 2015, Constable Kwesi Millington was sentenced to 30 months for the crime of perjury in his testimony to the Braidwood Inquiry. Justice William Ehrcke said it was "preposterous" that the Mountie claimed Dziekański was standing while he was stunned a second time, when it's clear from bystander video that Dziekański was already on the ground. In his ruling, Ehrcke said "The Crown has proven beyond a reasonable doubt that Constable Millington gave oral evidence under oath which he knew at the time to be false, and he did so with the intention to mislead the inquiry."

Constable Bill Bentley was cleared of similar charges by Justice Mark McEwan, but as of June 22, 2015 the Crown had appealed the verdict. Robinson was then awaiting the verdict in his case, while Rundel's trial was "almost finished" at that point in time.

More than ten years after the killing, on 30 October 2017, the Supreme Court of Canada dismissed the appeals and affirmed the sentences of both Kwesi Millington, and Benjamin Robinson, both of whom were convicted of perjury. Millington was sentenced to 30 months and Robinson to 2 years.

=== Other investigations ===
==== Investigation completed ====
- A review of taser use by police in Manitoba (November 15, 2007)
- Canada Border Services Agency (November 26, 2007)
- Vancouver International Airport Authority (December 7, 2007)
- Commission for Public Complaints Against the RCMP interim report (December 12, 2007)
- A review of Tasers by the Government of Nova Scotia after Halifax Regional Police tasered a man (March 5, 2008)
- RCMP's Integrated Homicide Investigation Team (IHIT) (Internal Investigation June 18, 2008)
- The Commission for Public Complaints Against the RCMP Final Report concerning the RCMP's use of the Conducted Energy Weapon (CEW) (June 18, 2008)
- Standing Committee on Public Safety and National Security of the House of Commons (June 19, 2008)
- Compliance Strategy Group (Kiedrowski's Report) conducted an independent review of the adoption and use of Conducted Energy Weapons by the Royal Canadian Mounted Police in June 2008 and released under the Access to Information and Privacy Act.
- On November 8, 2007, the chair of the Commission for Public Complaints Against the RCMP initiated a complaint concerning the incident. In a subsequent report dated November 30, 2007, it was noted that the Commission for Public Complaints "will continue its review of the incident in accordance with the terms of the Chair-initiated complaint initiated on November 8, 2007". The CPC released its report on December 8, 2009, highlighting 23 findings and 16 recommendations. Among its findings were that while the officers were in the lawful execution of their duties, they failed to adopt an appropriate response. It deemed their use of tasers were "premature and inappropriate" with no warnings given prior to use and their versions of events given to investigators were "not deemed credible" by the CPC.

==== Closing of investigations in Poland ====
Ministry of Justice of the Republic of Poland Prosecution Service in Gliwice launched their own investigation while assisting Canadian police visiting Poland as part of the Canadian investigation. Polish criminal code allows for the pursuit of foreign nationals suspected of committing crime against the Polish citizens abroad, which could lead to an extradition request. The Prosecution Office forwarded a request for assistance from Canada. The request for documents from the Canadian investigation was denied with the rationale that forwarding them is not in the best interest of that country. Under the circumstances, in December 2011 the Polish investigation was terminated.

== Apology ==
Almost two and a half years after the incident, the RCMP issued an apology to Dziekański's mother, Zofia Cisowski. Gary Bass, the RCMP deputy commissioner of the Pacific region formally apologized during a news conference at the Vancouver International Airport on April 1, 2010. Cisowski accepted the apology, confirmed she had accepted a financial settlement as compensation for her son's death and that she would drop the lawsuit she filed in 2009 against the federal and provincial governments, the airport and the four RCMP officers who fired the Taser at her son. Prior to that apology, Sergeant Tim Shields, who had been the head of the Communications Section for the BC RCMP at that time, issued the RCMP's first apology on the case on April 21, 2009, for inaccuracies in the RCMP's public statements and communications and admitted that errors had been made. This was the first apology given by the RCMP.

== See also ==
- List of controversies involving the Royal Canadian Mounted Police
- List of incidents of police excessive use of force in Canada
- Taser safety issues

=== Other incidents with tasers ===
- Death of Jordan Begley
- Death of Kelly Thomas
- Death of Igor Stachowiak
- UCLA taser incident
- University of Florida taser incident
