= Taser =

Electroshock weapon

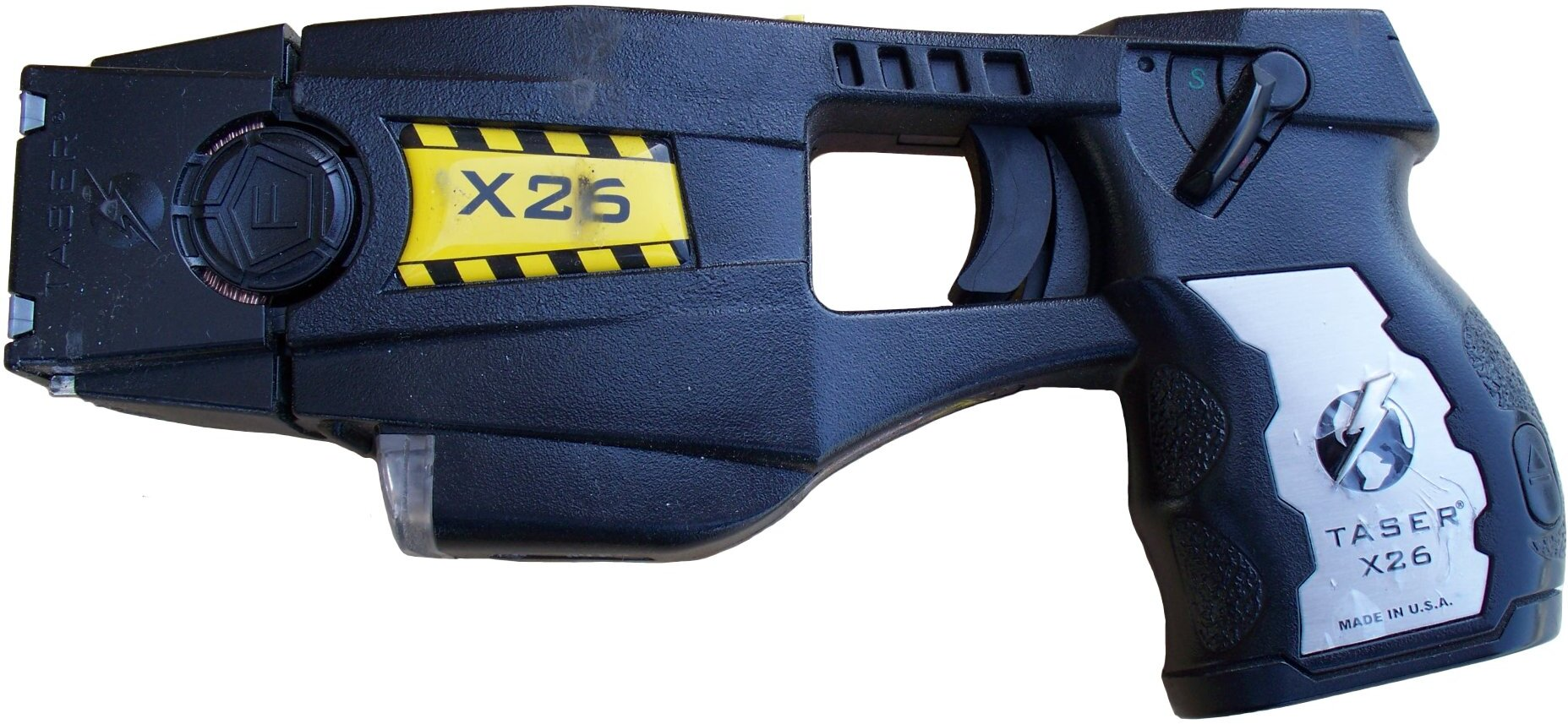
- Police issue Taser X26 device with cartridge installed
- Product type: Electroshock weapons
- Current owner: Axon Enterprise
- Country: United States
- Introduced: 1993; 33 years ago

Taser (stylized in all caps) is a line of handheld conducted energy devices (CED) sold by Axon Enterprise (formerly Taser International). The device fires multiple small barbed darts intended to hit a target and puncture its skin. The darts are connected to the main unit by thin wires that achieve a high dielectric strength and durability given the extremely high-voltage electric current they conduct (typically 50,000 volts, or 2,000 volts under load), which can be delivered to a target in short-duration pulses from a core of copper wire in the main unit. This enormous rush of voltage into its body produces effects ranging from localized pain to strong involuntary long muscle contractions, causing "neuromuscular incapacitation" (NMI), based on the mode of use (tasing frequency and environmental factors) and connectivity of the darts. When a target is successfully immobilized, it is said to have been "tasered" or "tased".

The first Taser conducted energy weapon was introduced in 1993 as a less-lethal option for police to use to subdue belligerent or fleeing suspects, who might otherwise need to be subdued with more lethal means such as firearms. As of 2010, over 15,000 law enforcement and military agencies around the world used Tasers as part of their use of force continuum. In the United States, Tasers are marketed as less-lethal (as opposed to non-lethal), since the possibility of serious injury or death still exists whenever the weapon is deployed. At least 49 people died in 2018 after being shocked by police with a Taser. Personal-use Tasers are marketed in the US but prohibited in Canada, where there is a categorical ban on all conducted energy weapons such as stun guns and Tasers, except for use by law enforcement and wildlife conservationists.

A 2009 report by the Police Executive Research Forum in the United States found that police officer injuries dropped by 76% in large law enforcement agencies that deployed Taser devices in the first decade of the 21st century compared with those that did not use them at all. Axon and its CEO Rick Smith have claimed that unspecified "police surveys" show that the device has "saved 75,000 lives through 2011".

== History ==
A United States patent by Kunio Shimizu titled "Arrest device" filed in 1966 describes an electrical discharge gun with a projectile connected to a wire with a pair of electrode needles for skin attachment.

Jack Cover, a NASA researcher, began developing the first Taser in 1969. By 1974, Cover had completed the device, which he named Taser, using a loose acronym inspired by the title of the 1911 novel Tom Swift and His Electric Rifle, a book written by the Stratemeyer Syndicate under the pseudonym Victor Appleton and featuring Cover's childhood hero, Tom Swift. This was also done on the pattern of laser, as both a Taser and a laser fire a "beam" of energy at an object.

The first Taser model that was offered for sale, called the Taser Public Defender, used gunpowder as its propellant, which led the Bureau of Alcohol, Tobacco and Firearms to classify it as a firearm in 1976.

Former Taser International CEO Patrick Smith testified in a Taser-related lawsuit that the catalyst for the development of the device was the "shooting death of two of his high school acquaintances" by a "guy with a legally licensed gun who lost his temper".

In 1993, Rick Smith and his brother Thomas founded the original company, Taser, and began to investigate what they called "safer use of force option[s] for citizens and law enforcement". At their Scottsdale, Arizona facilities, the brothers worked with Cover to develop a "non-firearm Taser electronic control device". The 1994 Air Taser Model 34000 conducted energy device had an "anti-felon identification (AFID) system" to prevent the likelihood that the device would be used by criminals; upon use, it released many small pieces of paper containing the serial number of the Taser device. The U.S. Bureau of Alcohol, Tobacco, Firearms and Explosives (ATF) stated that the Air Taser conducted energy device was not a firearm.

In 1999, Taser International developed an "ergonomically handgun-shaped device called the Advanced Taser M-series systems", which used a "patented neuromuscular incapacitation (NMI) technology". In May 2003, Taser International released the Taser X26 conducted energy device, which used "shaped pulse technology". On July 27, 2009, Taser International released a new type of Taser device called the X3, which can fire three shots before reloading. It holds three new type cartridges, which are much thinner than the previous model. On April 5, 2017, Taser announced that it was rebranding itself as Axon to reflect its expanded business into body cameras and software. In 2018, Taser 7 conducted energy device was released, the seventh generation of Taser devices from Axon. The latest Taser device, the Taser 10 conducted energy device, was released in 2023.

== Function ==
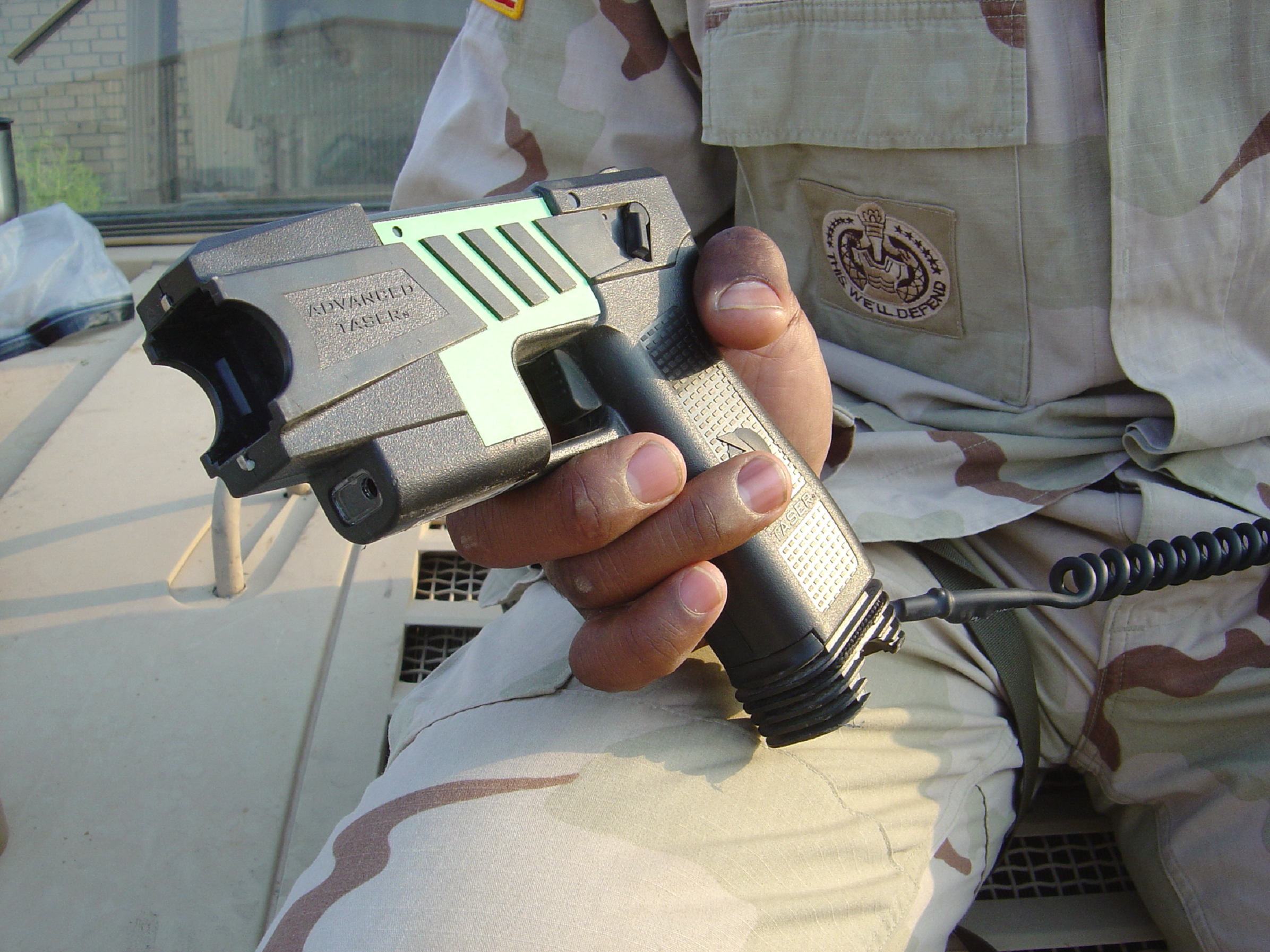
The Advanced Taser M26 comes in a green and black color combination for the United States military.

A Taser device fires multiple small dart-like electrodes, which stay connected to the main unit by thin insulated copper wire as they are propelled by small compressed nitrogen charges. The cartridge contains a pair of electrodes and propellant for a single shot and is replaced after each use. Once fired the probes travel at 180 feet (55 m) per second, spread 12 inches (300 mm) apart for every 7 feet (2.1 m) they travel, and must land at least 4 inches (100 mm) apart from each other to complete the circuit and channel an electric pulse into the target's body. They deliver a modulated electric current designed to disrupt voluntary control of muscles, causing "neuromuscular incapacitation". The effects of a Taser device may only be localized pain or strong involuntary long muscle contractions, based on the mode of use, connectivity and location of the darts on the body. The Taser device is marketed as "less-lethal", since the possibility of serious injury or death exists whenever the weapon is deployed.

There are a number of cartridges designated by range, with the maximum at 35 feet (11 m). Cartridges available to non-law enforcement consumers are limited to 15 feet (4.6 m). Practically speaking, police officers must generally be within 15 to 25 feet (4.6 to 7.6 m) to use a Taser, though the X26's probes can travel as far as 35 feet.

The electrodes are pointed to penetrate clothing and barbed to prevent removal once in place. The original Taser device probes unspool the wire from the cartridge, causing a yaw effect before the dart stabilizes, which made it difficult to penetrate thick clothing. Newer versions (X26, C2) use a "shaped pulse" that increases effectiveness in the presence of barriers.

The Taser 7 conducted energy device is a two-shot device with increased reliability over legacy products. The conductive wires spool from the dart when the Taser 7 conducted energy device is fired, instead of spooling from the Taser cartridge which increases stability while in flight and therefore increases accuracy. The spiral darts fly straighter and faster with nearly twice the kinetic energy for better connection to the target and penetration through thicker clothing. The body of the dart breaks away to allow for containment at tough angles. Taser 7 has a 93% increased probe spread at close range, where 85% of deployments occur, according to agency reports. Rapid arc technology with adaptive cross-connection helps enable full incapacitation even at close range. Taser 7 wirelessly connects to the Axon network, allowing for easier updates and inventory management.

A Taser device may provide a safety benefit to police officers. The use of a Taser device has a greater deployment range than batons, pepper spray, or empty hand techniques. This allows police to maintain a greater distance. A 2008 study of use-of-force incidents by the Calgary Police Service conducted by the Canadian Police Research Centre found that the use of the Taser device resulted in fewer injuries than the use of batons or empty hand techniques. The study found that only pepper spray was a safer intervention option.

A typical Taser device can operate with a peak voltage of 50 kilovolts (1200 volts to the body) and an average electric current of 1.9 milliamps, delivered as 100-microsecond pulses at a rate of 19 per second. A supplier quotes a current of 3-4 milliamps.

== Models ==
As of September 30, 2024, Axon has three main models of Taser conducted electrical weapons (CEWs) available for law enforcement and civilians where it is legal. Axons also lists the Taser Pulse as a civilian weapon, which runs at a 30 second cycle once fired; this is intended to allow the user to drop the CEW after firing and the escape from the target while they are incapacitated.

The Taser X26P is a single-shot CEW. This was the main Taser model during the 2000s and 2010s, today it is intended as a compact model.

The Taser X2 adds dual lasers and a button-activated warning arc function. When the warning arc is engaged, the Taser CEW will display an arc of electricity at the front of the device without firing the cartridge, which is intended to intimidate an aggressor with the goal of having them voluntarily comply without the officer needing to use force.

The Taser 7 is a two-shot device with spiral darts that spool from the dart allowing the probes to fly straighter. It also adds the ability to load cartridges intended for different ranges.

The Taser 10 device was officially announced by Axon on January 24, 2023. In addition to the functions of the Taser 7, the Taser 10 features an increased probe distance of up to 45 feet, waterproof capabilities, increased probe velocity (205 feet per second), and ability to deploy the probes individually allowing the officer to create their own "spread" unlike previous models, which relied heavily on precise aiming of the prongs at a fixed angle with the assistance of two lasers. The warning arc function was replaced with a high-pitched warning noise upon activating the weapon.

== Lethality ==
As with all less-lethal weapons, use of the Taser system is never risk-free. Sharp metal projectiles and electricity are in use, so misuse or abuse of the weapon increases the likelihood that serious injury or death may occur. In addition, the manufacturer has identified other risk factors that may increase the risks of use. Persons and animals that are small, pregnant, elderly, or very thin are considered at higher risk. Persons and animals with known medical problems, such as heart disease, history of seizure, or have a pacemaker are also at greater risk. Axon also warns that repeated, extended, or continuous exposure to the weapon is not safe. Because of this, the Police Executive Research Forum says that total exposure should not exceed 15 seconds. A doctor or veterinarian must check the subject's welfare and deliver all necessary treatment to relieve pain and distress immediately after the incident. Subjects may appear uninjured immediately after the TASER has stopped discharging, but it is important that any subject which has been tasered should be assessed by a doctor or veterinarian and receive appropriate medical treatment as soon as possible after the incident.

There are other circumstances that pose higher secondary risks of serious injury or death, including:

- Uncontrolled falls or subjects falling from elevated positions
- Subjects running on hard or rough surfaces, like asphalt
- Persons operating machinery or conveyances (cars, motorcycles, bikes, skateboards)
- Deployment into sensitive areas of the body such as the eyes, throat, or genitals
- Places where explosive or flammable substances are present
- Tasers can ignite gasoline and hand sanitizer

Fulton County, Georgia District Attorney Paul Howard Jr. said in 2020 that "under Georgia law, a Taser is considered as a deadly weapon." A 2012 study published in the American Heart Association's journal Circulation found that Tasers can cause "ventricular arrhythmias, sudden cardiac arrest and even death". In 2014, NAACP State Conference President Scot X. Esdaile and the Connecticut NAACP argued that Tasers cause lethal results. Reuters reported that more than 1,000 people shocked with a Taser by police died through the end of 2018, nearly all of them since the early 2000s. At least 49 people died in the US in 2018 after being shocked by police with a Taser.

== Drive Stun capability ==
Some Taser device models, particularly those used by police departments, also have a "Drive Stun" capability, where the Taser device is held against the target without firing the projectiles, and is intended to cause pain without incapacitating the target. "Drive Stun" is "the process of using the EMD (Electro Muscular Disruption) weapon as a pain compliance technique. This is done by activating the Taser [device] and placing it against an individual's body. This can be done without an air cartridge in place or after an air cartridge has been deployed."

Guidelines released in 2011 by the U.S. Department of Justice recommend that use of Drive Stun as a pain compliance technique be avoided. The guidelines were issued by a joint committee of the Police Executive Research Forum and the U.S. Department of Justice Office of Community Oriented Policing Services. The guidelines state "Using the CEW to achieve pain compliance may have limited effectiveness and, when used repeatedly, may even exacerbate the situation by inducing rage in the subject."

A study of U.S. police and sheriff departments found that 29.6% of the jurisdictions allowed the use of Drive Stun for gaining compliance in a passive resistance arrest scenario, with no physical contact between the officer and the subject. For a scenario that also includes non-violent physical contact, this number is 65.2%.

A Las Vegas police document says "The Drive Stun causes significant localized pain in the area touched by the Taser [CEW], but does not have a significant effect on the central nervous system. The Drive Stun does not incapacitate a subject but may assist in taking a subject into custody." The UCLA Taser incident and the University of Florida Taser incident involved university police officers using their Taser device's "Drive Stun" capability (referred to as a "contact tase" in the University of Florida Offense Report).

Amnesty International has expressed particular concern about Drive Stun, noting that "the potential to use Tasers in drive-stun mode—where they are used as 'pain compliance' tools when individuals are already effectively in custody—and the capacity to inflict multiple and prolonged shocks, renders the weapons inherently open to abuse."

== Users ==
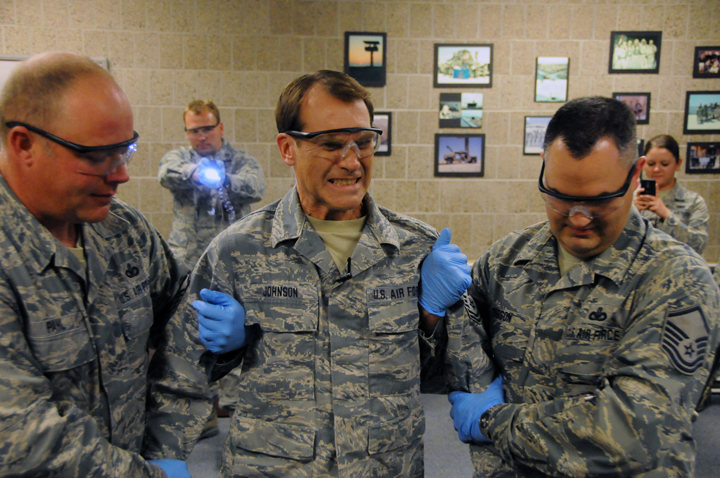
Taser demonstration by the North Dakota Air National Guard. The center person is being shocked through his back while being held to prevent falling injuries.

According to Axon Enterprise, as of 2025, Taser's brand models were used by over 18,000 law enforcement agencies in more than 80 countries. Just as the number of agencies deploying Taser conducted energy weapons has continued to increase each year, so too the number of Taser device related "incidents" between law enforcement officers and suspects has been on the rise.

== Excited delirium syndrome ==
Some of the deaths associated with Taser devices have been blamed on excited delirium, a controversial pseudoscientific diagnosis that supposedly involves extreme agitation and aggressiveness. It has typically been diagnosed postmortem in young adult black males who were physically restrained by law enforcement at the time of death. The diagnosis was supported only by the American College of Emergency Physicians from 2009 to 2023 and the National Association of Medical Examiners until 2023.

Excited delirium is thought to involve delirium, psychomotor agitation, anxiety, hallucinations, speech disturbances, disorientation, violent and bizarre behavior, insensitivity to pain, elevated body temperature, and increased strength. Excited delirium is associated with sudden death (usually via cardiac or respiratory arrest), particularly following the use of physical control measures, including police restraint and Taser devices. Excited delirium is most commonly diagnosed in male subjects with a history of serious mental illness or acute or chronic drug abuse, particularly stimulant drugs such as cocaine. Alcohol withdrawal or head trauma may also contribute to the condition.

The diagnosis of excited delirium has been controversial. Excited delirium has been listed as a cause of death by some medical examiners for several years, mainly as a diagnosis of exclusion established on autopsy. Additionally, academic discussion of excited delirium has been largely confined to forensic science literature, providing limited documentation about patients that survive the condition. These circumstances have led some civil liberties groups to question the cause of death diagnosis, claiming that excited delirium has been used to "excuse and exonerate" law enforcement authorities following the death of detained subjects, a possible "conspiracy or cover-up for brutality" when restraining agitated individuals. Also contributing to the controversy is the role of Taser device use in excited delirium deaths.

Excited delirium is not found in the current version of the Diagnostic and Statistical Manual of Mental Disorders. The term excited delirium was accepted by the National Association of Medical Examiners and the American College of Emergency Physicians, who argued in a 2009 white paper that excited delirium may be described by several codes within the ICD-9. In 2017, investigative reporters from Reuters reported that three of the 19 members of the 2009 task force were paid consultants for Axon, the manufacturer of Tasers.

== Usage worldwide ==
Taser legal status map by country Taser illegal or require restrictive license Ownership allowed without a permit but carrying prohibited or requires restrictive license Ownership and carrying require permissive license Ownership allowed without a permit but carrying requires permissive license Ownership and carrying tasers allowed without a permit

=== Australia ===
Tasers are prohibited for civilian ownership in Australia in every state and territory.

=== Canada ===
Conducted energy weapons are classed as "prohibited weapons", making them illegal for civilian ownership. In police services CEWs are very common, with most front-line officers having a Taser as a standard issue weapon.

=== China ===
Under the Law of the People's Republic of China on the Control of Firearms and Public Security Punishment Law, Tasers are prohibited for civilian ownership in China without an application for a state licence. A weapons permit is required to purchase and own a Taser.

=== Germany ===
Since April 2008, Tasers can be legally purchased by persons 18 and older, but can only be carried by persons with a firearm carry permit (Waffenschein), which is only issued under very restricted conditions.

In 2001, Germany approved a pilot project allowing individual states to issue Tasers to their SEK teams (police tactical units); by 2018, 13 out of 16 states had done so. A number of states have also provided a limited number of Tasers to their general police forces. Some states, such as Berlin, have use of force guidelines that only permit Taser use where firearm use would also be justified.

The Bundeswehr (German armed forces) does not issue Tasers nor are they used in training.

=== Ireland ===
Under the Firearms Act of 1925, Tasers, pepper spray and stun guns are illegal to possess or purchase in Ireland, even with a valid firearms certificate.

=== Italy ===
In Italy, Tasers are subject to strict regulation because they are legally classified as weapons. Under Law No. 110 of 18 April 1975 (Supplementary provisions on the control of weapons, ammunition and explosives), Article 4 lists the Taser among weapons and objects capable of causing injury that may not be carried outside one's residence without official authorization.

=== Jamaica ===
Tasers are legal for civilians to own, provided they possess a valid permit under the Customs Act. Currently, police in Jamaica do not have access to Tasers, but in February 2021, Corporal James Rohan, Chairman of the Police Federation, requested access to non-lethal weaponry in order to deal more effectively with encounters with mentally ill individuals.

=== Japan ===
Under the Firearm and Sword Possession Control Law, import, carrying, purchase of conducted energy weapons is prohibited in Japan. Stun guns are legal to own, although carrying without "justifiable grounds" is illegal and can be prosecuted under the Minor Offenses Act.

=== Poland ===
Any electroshock weapon, including stun guns and Tasers, with amperage under 10 mA can be purchased by anyone over the age of 18 without permit or background checks. As most Tasers fulfil those criteria, they are widely available in self-defence stores.

=== Russia ===
Stun guns and Tasers made in Russia can be purchased for self-defense without special permission, however, under the Federal Law No. 150 "On Weapons" of the Russian Federation it's illegal to import and subsequent sale of any foreign stun devices or Tasers into the country. The ban has been in place since the first version of the law was approved in 1996.

=== United Arab Emirates ===
Tasers are classified as weapons under Federal Law No. 3 of 2009, and therefore require a valid license to own or import.

=== United Kingdom ===
Tasers have been in use by UK police forces since 2003, and they require 18 hours of initial training, spread across three days, followed by six hours of annual top-up training, in order for a police officer to be allowed to carry and use one. Members of the general public are not allowed to own Tasers, with possession or sale of a Taser punishable by up to 10 years in prison. As of September 2019, 30,548 (19%) of police officers were trained to use Tasers. Tasers were deployed 23,000 times from March 2018 to March 2019, compared to only 10,000 times in 2013; however the UK police definition of "deployed" means that the weapon has been drawn; in the majority of cases it will not have been fired. In March 2020, extra funding was provided to purchase devices to allow more than 8,000 extra British police officers to carry a Taser.

== Use on children and the elderly ==
There has been considerable controversy over the use of Taser devices on children and in schools.

=== Criminal use ===
The earliest known case of a Taser being used on a child was on June 10, 1991, when one was used to incapacitate an 11-year-old girl in order to kidnap her. According to Jaycee Dugard, whenever she tried to escape, her kidnapper threatened to use the Taser again.

=== Police use ===
In 2004, the parents of a 6-year-old boy in Miami sued the Miami-Dade County Police department for firing a Taser device at their child. The police said the boy was threatening to injure his own leg with a shard of glass, and said that using the device was the safest option to prevent the boy from injuring himself. The boy's mother told CNN that the three officers involved probably found it easier not to reason with her child. In the same county two weeks later, a 12-year-old girl skipping school and drinking alcohol was tased while she was running from police. The Miami-Dade County Police reported that the girl had started to run into traffic and that the Taser device was deployed to stop her from being hit by cars or causing an automobile accident. In March 2008, an 11-year-old girl was subdued with a Taser device.

Police claim that the use of Taser conducted energy weapons on smaller subjects and elderly subjects is safer than alternative methods of subduing suspects, alleging that striking them or falling on them will cause much more injury than a Taser device, because the device is designed to only cause the contraction of muscles. Critics counter that Taser devices may interact with pre-existing medical complications such as medications, and may even contribute to someone's death as a result. Critics also suggest that using a Taser conducted electrical weapon on a minor, particularly a young child, is effectively cruel and abusive punishment, or unnecessary.

In May 2023, in Cooma, NSW, Australia, police tasered a 95-yr old dementia patient from less than 2 m (6.6 ft) away after apparently giving up on negotiations with her to drop the knife she was holding. At the time, she was standing upright & holding onto her 4-wheel walker. She survived the incident, but succumbed to head injuries sustained in the subsequent fall and died a week later. Her Estate sued the NSW Government, and, in April 2024, the accused & suspended police officer pleaded not guilty to manslaughter & remained free on bail awaiting trial. On 27 November 2024, the officer, Senior Constable Kristian White, was found guilty of manslaughter.

== Excessive use by law enforcement ==
US ICE agents tase and detain a person on railroad tracks during the Delaney Hall protests, 2026

In 2019, two Oklahoma police officers used Tasers over 50 times on an unarmed man resulting in death. Both officers were later convicted of second-degree murder. In January 2023, Los Angeles Police Department officers tasered a teacher at least 6 times resulting in the man's death. In 2014, Catasauqua, PA police officers inflicted serious injuries on a man, during a DUI arrest, when they tasered him eleven times while he was handcuffed and restrained in the back of a police vehicle.

A New York Times study published in 2025 collected Taser log documents from 36 police departments in Mississippi from 2020 through 2024. Data collection was incomplete, since several departments submitted no data or only partial data. The study identified 44,000 incidents in which one or more Tasers were triggered for at least one second each over the course of an hour. Reporters manually reviewed the nearly 1,000 cases that lasted at least 15 seconds. Once training operations were eliminated, the review found 611 incidents that lasted at least 15 seconds (the maximum shock duration per encounter recommended under national standards). In addition to 44 allegations of "Taser abuse over the past decade from lawsuits and department records", the Times reporters found hundreds more "incidents that raise red flags by examining Taser logs across the state". Cases described in the article include 11 people who were shocked while they were pinned down or handcuffed, such as Vivian Burks, an unarmed 65-year-old great-grandmother accused of marijuana use who was shocked 4 times in under one minute, and Keith Murriel, who died after being shocked at least 40 times for refusal to leave a hotel parking lot.

== Use on non-human subjects ==
=== Domestic animals ===
Tasers may be deployed against an animal as part of a plan to deal with a potentially dangerous animal, such as a large dog, if the animal reasonably appears to pose an imminent threat to human safety, and alternative methods are not viable.

=== Wildlife ===
Tasers are used to immobilize wildlife for research, relocation, or treatment as a less lethal and more humane alternative to tranquilizer darts. The taser X3W, also known as the wildlife taser, is a taser designed specifically for wild animals. "It's a highly effective way to lay out a deer or a moose entangled in netting or ropes long enough for game wardens to rush in and cut it free," says Brian DeBolt. The X3W is a modified version of the company's X3 design. Unlike the X3, the X3W delivers a current of 3.6 milliamps and has an adjustable pulse rate. The standard setting has a rate of 19 pulses per second while the "large animal" setting has a rate of 29 pulses per second.

== Use in torture ==
A report from a meeting of the United Nations Committee Against Torture states that "The Committee was worried that the use of Taser X26 weapons, provoking extreme pain, constituted a form of torture, and that in certain cases it could also cause death, as shown by several reliable studies and by certain cases that had happened after practical use." Amnesty International has also raised extensive concerns about the use of other electro-shock devices by American police and in American prisons, as they can be (and according to Amnesty International, sometimes are) used to inflict cruel pain on individuals.

In response to the claims that the pain inflicted by the use of the Taser device could potentially constitute torture, Tom Smith, the Chairman of the Taser Board, stated that the U.N. is "out of touch" with the needs of modern policing and asserted that "Pepper spray goes on for hours and hours, hitting someone with a baton breaks limbs, shooting someone with a firearm causes permanent damage, even punching and kicking—the intent of those tools is to inflict pain, ... with the Taser device, the intent is not to inflict pain; it's to end the confrontation. When it's over, it's over."

== See also ==
- Braidwood Inquiry – 2007 police killing at Vancouver Airport
- Dazzler – Non-lethal temporary blindness weapon
- Death of Beto Laudisio – 2012 death of Brazilian man under police custody
- Graduated Electronic Decelerator – Electrical torture device
- History of New York divorce coercion gang – Kidnap and torture ring
- Killing of Robert Dziekański – 2007 police killing at Vancouver Airport
- Stun belt – Wearable electric shock device
