= Harvey Mansfield =

American political philosopher

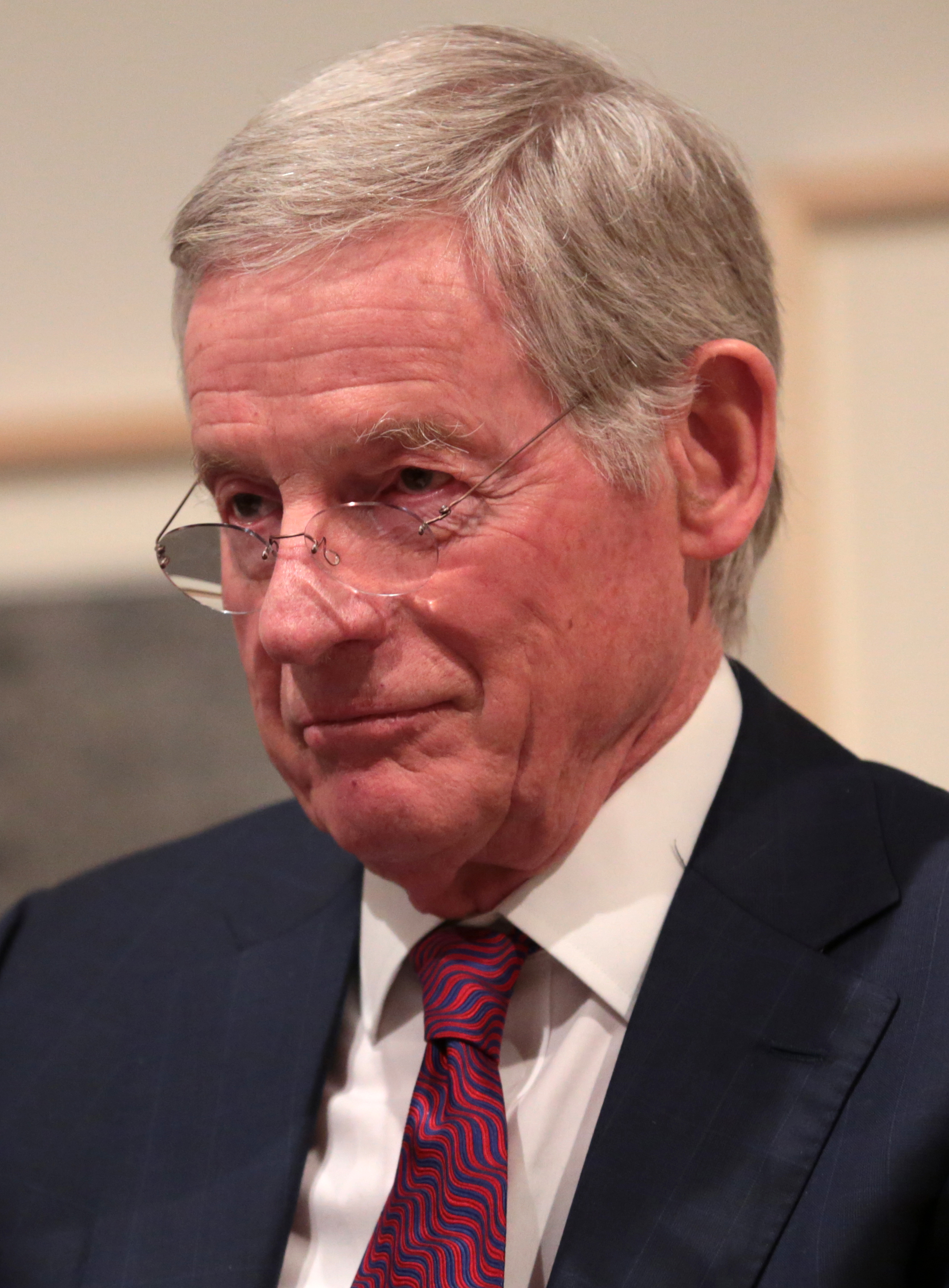
- Mansfield in March 2017
- Born: Harvey Claflin Mansfield Jr. March 21, 1932 (age 94); New Haven, Connecticut, U.S.
- Occupation: William R. Kenan Jr. Professor of Government
- Children: 3
- Awards: National Humanities Medal; Guggenheim Fellowship; Bradley Prize; Philip Merrill Award

Education
- Education: Harvard University (BA, PhD)

Philosophical work
- Institutions: University of California, Berkeley; Harvard University; Hoover Institution, Stanford University
- Notable works: Manliness (2006)

Harvey Claflin Mansfield Jr. (born March 21, 1932) is an American political philosopher. He was the William R. Kenan Jr. Professor of Government at Harvard University, where he taught from 1962 until his retirement in 2023. He has held Guggenheim and NEH Fellowships and has been a Fellow at the National Humanities Center. In 2004, he was awarded the National Humanities Medal by President George W. Bush and delivered the Jefferson Lecture in 2007.

Mansfield is a scholar of political history, and was greatly influenced by Leo Strauss. He is also the Carol G. Simon Senior Fellow at the Hoover Institution of Stanford University. Mansfield is notable for his generally conservative stance on political issues in his writings. At Harvard, he became one of the university's most prominent conservative figures. In 2023, he retired from teaching as one of the university's longest-serving faculty members.

His notable former students include: Mark Blitz, James Ceaser, Tom Cotton, Andrew Sullivan, Charles R. Kesler, Alan Keyes, William Kristol, Clifford Orwin, Paul Cantor, Mark Lilla, Francis Fukuyama, Sharon Krause, Costin Alamariu, Bruno Maçães, and Shen Tong.

== Biography ==
Mansfield was born in New Haven, Connecticut, on March 21, 1932. His mother, Grace Yarrow Mansfield, was an alumna of Vassar College, and coeditor, with Elizabeth Bristol Greenleaf, of a book on the ballads and sea songs of Newfoundland. His father, Harvey Mansfield Sr., had been editor of the American Political Science Review and was the Ruggles Professor Emeritus of Public Law and Government at Columbia University at the time of his death in 1988 at the age of 83. Mansfield Sr., who had also taught at Yale and been the department chairman at Ohio State, was described by his son as "a New Deal Democrat, a liberal who had an aversion to the Left." At Ohio State, Mansfield had met Harry V. Jaffa, a young assistant professor whose anti-Communist conservatism was also an influence. Like Jaffa, Mansfield eventually joined the Republican Party over the issue of communism.

Mansfield was educated at public schools before college. In 1949, he enrolled at Harvard University with a focus in studying government. As a freshman, he took Natural Sciences 4, taught by Harvard president James Conant, a general education class that explored the relationship of science to humanity, inspired by Conant's involvement with the Manhattan Project. He received his Bachelor of Arts in 1953. As an undergraduate, he was a liberal who supported Adlai Stevenson in the 1952 presidential election. His professors included Carl Friedrich, Samuel Beer and William Yandell Elliott.

After graduating, Mansfield received a Fulbright Scholarship to study in England for a year. Thanks to Beer's influence, he was able to attend a speech by Winston Churchill, which left an impression on him. From 1954 to 1956, he served in the United States Army in Virginia and France. With his academic background, Mansfield was ordered to give lectures to the troops on topics in United States history. He returned to Harvard and received his Ph.D. in 1961, with a dissertation published in 1965 as Statesmanship and Party Government: A Study of Burke and Bolingbroke. Mansfield initially began teaching at the University of California, Berkeley, for a few years before lecturing at Harvard. In 1969, he was appointed as a full professor and was chair of the university's government department from 1973 to 1976.

Mansfield was married to Delba Winthrop, with whom he co-translated and co-authored work on Tocqueville. Winthrop's doctoral dissertation (supervised by Mansfield), on Aristotle's view of democracy, was posthumously published in 2018.

He lives in Cambridge and in Ipswich, Massachusetts and is married to Anna Schmidt.

== Political philosophy ==
=== A Student's Guide to Political Philosophy ===
In his 2001 book A Student's Guide to Political Philosophy, Mansfield traces the history of political philosophy in "the great books" written by Plato, Aristotle, Locke, Rousseau, and others of the "highest rank" (1). He also finds political philosophy in practical politics, which Mansfield considers necessarily partisan, because it involves citizens "arguing passionately pro and con with advocacy and denigration, accusation and defense" (2). He argues that politics does not merely consist of liberal and conservative options, but rather, they are fundamentally opposed to each other, with each side defending its own interest as it attempts to appeal to the common good (2). Since such adversarial sides in a political dispute appeal to the common good, an observer of the dispute can use his capacity to reason to judge which side supplies the most compelling arguments. If such an observer is competent to be a judge, he or she may be thought of as a political philosopher, or as at least on the way to engaging in political philosophy (2–3).

Mansfield stresses the connection between politics and political philosophy, but he does not find political philosophy in political science, which for Mansfield is a rival to political philosophy and "apes" the natural sciences (3–5). From Mansfield's point of view, political science replaces words like "good", "just", and "noble" with other words like "utility" or "preferences." The terms are meant to be neutral, but as a result of the political scientist's purported change of role and perspective from judge to so‑called "disinterested observer", such a "scientist" is not able to determine whose arguments are the best, because he or she falls victim to relativism, which, according to Mansfield, is "a sort of lazy dogmatism" (4–5).

In his guide, Mansfield reminds students that political science rebelled from political philosophy in the seventeenth century and declared itself distinct and separate in the positivist movement of the late nineteenth century: thus, he argues in it that whereas "Today political science is often said to be 'descriptive' or 'empirical,' concerned with facts; political philosophy is called 'normative' because it expresses values. But these terms merely repeat in more abstract form the difference between political science, which seeks agreement, and political philosophy, which seeks the best" (6).

Furthermore, according to Mansfield, when people talk about the difference between political philosophy and political science, they are actually talking about two distinct kinds of political philosophy, one modern and the other ancient. The only way to understand modern political science and its ancient alternative fully, he stresses, is to enter the history of political philosophy, and to study the tradition handed down over the centuries: "No one can count himself educated who does not have some acquaintance with this tradition. It informs you of the leading possibilities of human life, and by giving you a sense of what has been tried and what is now dominant, it tells you where we are now in a depth not available from any other source" (7–8). Although modern political science feels no obligation to look at its roots, and might even denigrate the subject as if it could not be of any real significance, he says, "our reasoning shows that the history of political philosophy is required for understanding its substance" (7–8).

=== Taming the Prince ===
In his book Taming the Prince, Mansfield traces the modern doctrine of executive power to Niccolò Machiavelli. He argues that executive power had to be tamed to become compatible with liberal constitutionalism.

== Political views ==
=== Western civilization ===
In response to multiculturalism on college campuses, Mansfield has defended the importance of preserving and teaching courses on Western civilization, even proposing a survey course that selects a dozen or so books that capture the principal themes. Mansfield believes that understanding Western civilization is important because the books that explain it deal with problems associated with the human condition.

On May 8, 2007, Mansfield delivered the 36th Jefferson Lecture ("the highest honor the federal government bestows for distinguished intellectual and public achievement in the humanities", according to the National Endowment for the Humanities, which sponsored the lecture). In his lecture, Mansfield suggests "two improvements for today’s understanding of politics arising from the humanities ... first ... to recapture the notion of thumos in Plato, and Aristotle... [and] ...second ... the use of names—proper to literature and foreign to science". This is a reference to his own philosophy, which forbids discounting the wisdom of the past simply because those who spoke it lived a long time ago.

=== The "strong executive" ===
Mansfield has argued that the President of the United States has "extra-legal powers such as commanding the military, making treaties (and carrying on foreign policy), and pardoning the convicted, not to mention a veto of legislation", observing that the U.S. Constitution does not ask the President to take an oath to execute the laws, but rather, to execute "the office of the president, which is larger." Referring to domestic surveillance, Mansfield notes:

Those arguing that the executive should be subject to checks and balances are wrong to say or imply that the president may be checked in the sense of stopped. The president can be held accountable and made responsible, but if he could be stopped, the Constitution would lack any sure means of emergency action.

He defends the separation of powers, arguing that "the executive subordinated to the rule of law is in danger of being subordinate to the legislature."

=== Gender roles and equality ===
External videos
- After Words interview with Mansfield on Manliness, March 18, 2006, C-SPAN

In his 2006 book Manliness, Mansfield defended a moderately conservative understanding of gender roles, and bemoaned the loss of the virtue of manliness in a "gender neutral" society. In a New York Times interview, he defined the concept briefly as "confidence in a situation of risk. A manly man has to know what he is doing." He defines the idea in more concrete terms in the book. There, a manly man does not have to know what he is doing, but only has to act as though he does. Also in the book, Mansfield subjects the concept of manliness to a test in which he refers for support of his argument to such diverse authorities as Homer, Plato, Aristotle, Rudyard Kipling, Ernest Hemingway, and Naomi Wood. In his argument, manliness is ultimately related to assertiveness—"decisiveness without complete knowledge"—and its place in society is debated. In an interview with Bill Kristol, Mansfield said:

What I wrote was a modest defense of manliness. And the emphasis [is] on modest because manliness can be bad as well as good. Not everyone who takes risks deserves to have them turn out right and so manliness is, I think, responsible for a lot of evil. You can say that terrorists are manly, they’re willing to risk their lives and give their lives for a principle they believe in or a point they believe in.

Manliness was criticized by the philosopher and law scholar Martha Nussbaum in the June 22, 2006, issue of the New Republic. Nussbaum accuses Mansfield of misreading, or failing to read, many feminist and non-feminist texts, in addition to the ancient Greek and Roman classics he cites. She argues that his book is based on overt misogynistic assumptions that take a position of indifference towards violence against women. Mansfield asserts, she contends, that a woman can resist rape only with the aid of "a certain ladylike modesty enabling her to take offense at unwanted encroachment."

Concerning controversial comments by former President of Harvard, Lawrence Summers, about mental differences between men and women, Mansfield said that it is "probably true" that women "innately have less capacity than men at the highest level of science .... It's common sense if you just look at who the top scientists are."

=== LGBT rights ===
In 1993, Mansfield testified on behalf of Colorado's Amendment 2, which amended the state constitution to prevent gays, lesbians and bisexuals from pursuing legal claims of discrimination. In his testimony, he argued that being gay "is not a life that makes for happiness," that homosexuality is "shameful," and that by not being able to have children gay people were not "socially responsible." Nussbaum, who testified in the same trial against Amendment 2, later remarked that Mansfield's source for his claim that gay and lesbian people were unhappy was not contemporary social science research but the great books of the Western tradition (Plato, Tocqueville, Rousseau, etc.).

=== Grades and affirmative action ===
Mansfield has voiced criticism of grade inflation at Harvard University and claims it is due in part to affirmative action, but says he cannot show its causal effect. Critics have shown that grade inflation predates any significant presence of black students at Harvard. In November 1997, Mansfield participated in a debate on affirmative action between Cornel West and Michael Sandel (arguing for affirmative action) with Ruth Wisse and himself (arguing against affirmative action). The debate attracted a "massive audience" of a thousand Harvard students, requiring its campus venue to be changed twice before it could take place in Harvard's Sanders Theater, prompting Professor Sandel to comment, "This puts to rest the myth that this generation has a political apathy, and apathy to political debates." In 2013, Mansfield, after hearing from a dean that "the most frequent grade is an A," claimed to give students two grades: one for their transcript, and the one he thinks they deserve. He commented, "I didn’t want my students to be punished by being the only ones to suffer for getting an accurate grade."

In response to grade inflation, according to Harvard Crimson, Mansfield revived the "ironic" (or the "inflated") grade in 2006, in order to let his students know what they really deserved in his class without causing them harm by grading them lower than the other professors at Harvard: "In Mansfield’s 'true and serious' grading system, 5 percent of students will receive A’s, and 15 percent will receive A-minuses. But Mansfield won’t share those marks with anyone other than his teaching fellows and students. ... By contrast, Mansfield’s 'ironic' grade—the only one that will appear on official transcripts—will follow average grade distribution in the College, with about a quarter of students receiving A’s and another quarter receiving A-minu[s]es"; in contrast, their privately received deserved "real" (lower) grades usually centered around a C or C-minus, earning him the nickname "Harvey C-minus Mansfield." "This [grading] policy—meant to demonstrate the causes and effects of grade inflation—drew heat from students and faculty, and attracted national media attention." Mansfield himself has joked that his middle initial "C" stands for compassion: "That's what I lack when it comes to grading." In an interview with the Hoover Institution, Mansfield claimed that college professors are too quick to label students as exceptional.

== Books ==
- Statesmanship and Party Government: A Study of Burke and Bolingbroke. Chicago: University of Chicago Press, 1965.
- The Spirit of Liberalism. Cambridge: Harvard University Press, 1978.
- Machiavelli's New Modes and Orders: A Study of the Discourses on Livy. Ithaca, New York: Cornell University Press, 1979. Rpt. Chicago: University of Chicago Press, 2001.
- Thomas Jefferson: Selected Writings. Ed. and introd. Wheeling, Illinois: H. Davidson, 1979.
- Selected Letters of Edmund Burke. Ed. with introd. entitled "Burke's Theory of Political Practice". Chicago: University of Chicago Press, 1984.
- Taming the Prince: The Ambivalence of Modern Executive Power. New York City: The Free Press, 1989.
- America's Constitutional Soul. Baltimore: The Johns Hopkins University Press, 1991.
- Machiavelli’s Virtue. Chicago: University of Chicago Press, 1996.
- A Student’s Guide to Political Philosophy. Wilmington, Delaware: ISI Books, 2001.
- Manliness. New Haven: Yale University Press, 2006.
- Tocqueville: A Very Short Introduction. New York City: Oxford University Press, 2010.
- Mansfield, Harvey C. (2023). Machiavelli's Effectual Truth: Creating the Modern World. Cambridge: Cambridge University Press. ISBN 978-1-009-32012-2.
- The Rise and Fall of Rational Control: The History of Modern Political Philosophy. Cambridge, Massachusetts: Harvard University Press, 2026.
- Mansfield, Harvey C. (2026). Where Harvard Went Wrong: Fifty Years of Commentary that Fell on Deaf Ears. New York City: Encounter Books. ISBN 978-1641775014.

=== Translations ===
External videos
- Booknotes interview with Mansfield on his introduction to Tocqueville's Democracy in America, December 17, 2000, C-SPAN

- The Prince, by Niccolò Machiavelli. Introd. 2nd (corr.) ed. 1985; Chicago: University of Chicago Press, 1998. (Inc. glossary.)
- Florentine Histories, by Niccolò Machiavelli. Ed. and introd. Princeton, New Jersey: Princeton University Press, 1988. (Co-trans. and co-ed., Laura F. Banfield.)
- Discourses on Livy, by Niccolò Machiavelli. Introd. Chicago: University of Chicago Press, 1996. (Co-trans., Nathan Tarcov.)
- Democracy in America, by Alexis de Tocqueville. Introd. Chicago: University of Chicago Press, 2000. (Co-trans., Delba Winthrop.)

== Awards and honors ==
- Guggenheim Fellowship (1970–71)
- National Endowment for the Humanities Fellowship (1974–75)
- Member of the Council of the American Political Science Association (1980–82, 2004)
- Fellow of the National Humanities Center (1982)
- Member of the USIA's Board of Foreign Scholarships (1987–89)
- Member of the National Council on the Humanities (1991–94)
- Joseph R. Levenson Teaching Award (1993)
- President of the New England Historical Association (1993–94)
- Sidney Hook Memorial Award (2002)
- National Humanities Medal (2004)
- 36th Jefferson Lecture for the National Endowment for the Humanities (2007)

== Media appearances ==
- "Harvey Mansfield on the Neil Gorsuch Confirmation Hearings," Conversations with Bill Kristol, April 24, 2017.
- "Harvey Mansfield on Donald Trump and Political Philosophy," Conversations with Bill Kristol, December 19, 2016.
- "Harvey Mansfield on mysteries, Wodehouse, Wilson, Churchill, and Swift," Conversations with Bill Kristol, September 25, 2016.
- "Harvey Mansfield on America's Constitutional Soul," Conversations with Bill Kristol, July 31, 2016.
- "Harvey Mansfield on Manliness," Conversations with Bill Kristol, May 8, 2016.
- "Harvey Mansfield on Alexis de Tocqueville's "Democracy in America" Conversations with Bill Kristol, June 15, 2019.

== See also ==
- Democracy in America
- Ellis Sandoz
- Leo Strauss
