= Ken Gonzales-Day =

American conceptual artist (born 1964)

- Born: 1964 (age 61–62); Santa Clara, California, US
- Education: University of California Irvine, Hunter College, Pratt Institute
- Known for: Photography, conceptual art, installation art, writing, research
- Awards: John S. Guggenheim Fellowship, California Community Foundation, Creative Capital, National Endowment for the Arts
- Website: kengonzalesday.com

Ken Gonzales-Day (born 1964) is a Los Angeles-based conceptual artist best known for interdisciplinary projects that examine the historical construction of race, identity, and systems of representation including lynching photographs, museum display and street art. His widely exhibited "Erased Lynching" photographic series and book, Lynching in the West: 1850-1935 (2006), document the absence in historical accounts of the lynching of Latinos, Native Americans and Asians in California's early history. The series has toured in traveling exhibitions staged by the Los Angeles County Museum of Art (LACMA), Smithsonian Institution and Minnesota Museum of American Art, and appeared at the Tamayo Museum (Mexico City), Generali Foundation (Vienna) and Palais de Tokyo in Paris, among other venues.

Ken Gonzales-Day, The Wonder Gaze (St. James Park), "Erased Lynching" series, 2006

Los Angeles Times critic Holly Myers writes that Gonzales-Day's work conveys "a palpable quality of tenderness" through a "delicate form of visual ethics" that explores racial tendencies, perceptions and presumptions "without pinning the dialogue to actual individuals"; curator Gonzalo Casals describes his method as "simple artistic gesture[s] that allow for the reinterpretation of history, opening up new perspectives and allowing for the voices of the 'other' to rise above the official history." Gonzales-Day was awarded a Guggenheim Fellowship in photography in 2017, and is the Fletcher Jones Chair in Art at Scripps College in Claremont, California.

== Early life and education ==
Gonzales-Day was born in Santa Clara, California in 1964 to parents of mixed ethnicity and grew up in Northern California and Idaho; his father's family dates back to 17th-century New Mexico. He studied art at Pratt Institute (BFA, 1987, Painting) and art history at Hunter College in New York City (MA, 1991), before moving back to California, with his partner and husband, Gary Wolf (together since 1989); Mr. Wolf worked in the hospitality field with Westin, Hyatt and The Peninsula group. Gonzales-Day went on to earn an MFA at University of California, Irvine (1995).

In his first professional decade, Gonzales-Day was a practicing artist and critic, contributing regular reviews and articles to the publications Artissues, ART/TEXT and Leonardo, and books including Whiteness: A Wayward Construction (2003) and The Queer Encyclopedia of the Visual Arts (2004), among others. He began teaching at Scripps College in 1995, serving as Professor of Art and Chair of the Art and Art and Art History departments through various terms.

== Work and reception ==
Writers consider Gonzales-Day an artist and historian whose larger project (art and research) seeks to broaden the established canons of art and history to recognize those who have been erased, ignored or misrepresented due to race, ethnicity or sexuality. His conceptually oriented photography often focuses on historical gaps, literalized through prominent blank spaces or "visual silences"; critic Leah Ollman writes that his work instructs through the framing of holes in the record and collapsing of space between different times and places, "disturb[ing] in direct proportion to its importance." His work also draws on restorative justice practices that seek reconciliation, restitution, the recovery of history and public dialogue to remedy injustice.

== Early work ==
Ken Gonzales-Day, Ramonacita at the Cantina from Bone-Grass Boy: The Secret Banks of the Conejos River (1993–6, 2017)

Gonzales-Day's early art focuses on issues surrounding identity, multiculturalism and prejudice—which relate to his own liminal position as a gay Mexican-American—and on broader social concerns, including the AIDS crisis, queer rights, and immigration. Bone Grass Boy: The Secret Banks of the Conejos River (1993–6, recreated in 2017) explores these issues through the lens of his family's complex genealogy, which he re-envisioned as an invented Mexican–American War-era narrative whose partial text is presented as a historical artifact. The project combines the appropriation of master-painting poses and scenes, Pictures Generation-style costumed self-portraiture, and early digital imaging techniques in photographic tableaux in which Gonzales-Day portrays a wide cast of female and male ancestors/characters. His reassembled version added installation elements, including full-wall genealogical and regional mural-map renderings. Artillery's Annabel Osberg calls it "a conceptual yet cuttingly poignant photo-novella"; other reviewers described it as eerily timeless and timely, historical and futuristic, with a "ghostly sensuality."

Gonzales-Day's photography of the later 1990s and early 2000s explored similar issues, often through extreme close-up images of skin lesions and growths, tattoos or body parts that reviewers described as "ominous [and] strangely seductive" and "marvelous patterns assembled like a mosaic."

== "Erased Lynching" series (2002–17) and related works ==
The Erased Lynchings series arose out of research Gonzales-Day conducted that uncovered more than 350 lynchings of Latinos, Native Americans and Asians as well as African-Americans in California between 1850 and 1935, the most perpetrated against Latinos. Its images range from postcard-sized works to photomurals and billboard reproductions and are derived from appropriated lynching souvenir cards and archival sources, from which Gonzales-Day digitally removed the victim and rope (e.g., The Wonder Gaze (St. James Park), 2006–17). Critics suggest that the erasure crucially recalibrates the power of each image, redirecting scrutiny away from death to the spectacle, social dynamics, and relish of the perpetrators (often jeering and smiling disconcertingly); New York Times critic Holland Cotter notes that this shift also "makes hard lines between then and now, them and us, difficult to draw." The erasures additionally serve as a metaphor for the expunging of the victims from history and prevent their re-victimization through re-presentation.

Ken Gonzales-Day, Nightfall II, "Searching for California Hang Trees Series" series, 2007

Gonzales-Day also produced Lynching in the West (2006), an unprecedented textual and visual examination of California lynching in relation to frontier justice, race-based theories of criminality, whiteness, and public and photographed spectacle as visual culture. The book draws on newspaper articles, periodicals, and court records to reconstruct the circumstances surrounding the lynchings and juxtaposes Gonzales-Day's contemporary photographs of lynching sites with historical artifacts. Reviewers describe the work as an "essential corrective" to the Western frontier justice myth and a thought-provoking, innovative, cross-disciplinary example of visual and historical research.

For "Searching for California Hang Trees" (2002–14), Gonzales-Day sought to visit and photograph the more than 300 California lynching sites he uncovered. More performative than documentary—since many exact locations are unknown—the series' recordings and approximations feature stark, large-scale color portraits of trees, often set against flat, black backgrounds that range, according to reviews, from quietly beautiful to ordinary suburban to vaguely ominous (e.g. Nightfall I, 2007). Critics suggest that the trees' twisted roots, interwoven branches, and thick trunks—suggesting age, wisdom, silent witness and a land heavy with history—offer a critical look at landscape photography and the erasure of uncomfortable legacies within seemingly pastoral locales. In several exhibitions, Gonzales-Day juxtaposed the hang trees with his "Memento Mori" bust-length, frontal portraits of contemporary Latino men matching the lynching victims in age and ethnicity, which reviewers describe as similarly "elegant, muscular and mute." Gonzales-Day further extended the hang tree project with a self-guided walking tour of lynching sites in downtown Los Angeles.

In 2015, Gonzales-Day produced Run Up (directed by Andrew Hines), an eight-minute, stylized reenactment of California's last documented lynching of a Latino in Santa Rosa in 1920. Leah Ollman wrote, the film's "episodic and discontinuous, mildly haunting" approach shifts actions between cover of night and light of day, "conjuring the lynching's variable realities as suppressed history and public spectacle." Gonzales-Day exhibited the film with still photographs taken in Ferguson, Missouri and Los Angeles in the wake of protests and marches over recent police shootings of Michael Brown and others; the images of damaged environments and scenes of conflict incorporate period figures from the film's historical reenactment in poses that quote iconic art historical works, drawing parallels between spatially, temporally distant events.

== "Profiled" series and related works ==
Gonzales-Day's Profiled explores the legacies of slavery, colonialism and imperialism, and Western assumptions about beauty and human value through ethnological depictions in historic expositions and museum collections, methods of art instruction, and pseudo-sciences, such as physiognomy and mesmerism. Self-described as a "prequel" to Gonzales-Day's earlier projects, "Profiled" raises questions about the line between portraiture and caricature, categorization and hierarchies, and the commodification and internalization of aesthetics largely based on whiteness. Christopher Knight describes the series as a portrait of power in society that "lies outside the frame," its blankness echoing "with the force of a condemnation."

Ken Gonzales-Day, (Antico [Pier Jacopo Alari-Bonacolsi], Bust of a Young Man, The J. Paul Getty Museum, Los Angeles, CA; Francis Harwood, Bust of a Man, The J. Paul Getty Museum, Los Angeles, CA), "Profiled Series," 2010

The series' visual strategy (literalized in a title that also references racial profiling) is described by the Boston Globe as "a simple yet devastatingly effective conceit": photographs of museum statuary in facing profiles in single frames featuring pointed juxtapositions of Western classical "artworks" and anthropological depictions of "primitive" persons. Reviewers suggest that subtle lighting, positioning and delicate tinting create "electric fields" in the work, suggesting complex, silent, cross-cultural dialogues and sometimes-comic incongruities, as in an untitled work presenting a Blackfoot tribesman with crossed index fingers who seems to chastise a seducing Greek faun. Critic Sharon Mizota writes that in works such as one with facing black marble busts—one African, one recognizably Caucasian (see image, right)—what emerges "is something more tender and strange… the impassive sculptural pairs begin to look oddly like couples, gazing at each other across boundaries of geography, time and ignorance."

Gonzales-Day traced the idea further in the exhibition, "UnSeen: Our Past in a New Light" (Smithsonian National Portrait Gallery, 2018), in photographs of sculptural depictions of Native American and First Nations people from museum collections in Washington, DC. In the course of his work, Gonzales-Day discovered a forgotten piece of history: a neglected 1904 bust of the Osage priest, Shonke Mon-thi^; working with museum personnel, he uncovered the priest's story and historical importance, and the Portrait Gallery—dedicated to prominent historical figures—acquired his photo of the bust. Later works from this project, such as Americas (Large and Small Constellation) (2019), present museum objects in merged constellations or clusters that reflect on art historical categories and art collection themselves.

In 2024, Gonzales-Day's work was included in Xican-a.o.x. Body, a group exhibition at the Pérez Art Museum Miami, which traveled from the Cheech Marin Center for Chicano Art & Culture at the Riverside Art Museum. The show expanded on the contributions and experiences of Chicano artists to art historical narratives and contemporary discourse. An accompanying publication was released by Chicago University Press.

== Public art and related projects ==
Gonzales-Day has produced permanent public art works as well as temporary billboard installations of images from his "Erased Lynching" and "Profiled" series, some included as part of a For Freedoms fifty-state voting Initiative ahead of the 2018 U.S. mid-term elections.

His four photographic glazed-tile murals at the South Central Los Angeles County Administrative Building (2007) offer calming images of traditional California oaks in an often-stressful environment (e.g., California Landscape); an installation at the San Fernando Valley Canoga Metro Station (2012) subtly integrates the local landscape into the built environment with four large porcelain-enamel images of composite, imagined views of the surrounding mountains and two glass mosaics depicting kaleidoscopic, patterned images of native manzanita and oak trees. His commission for a LAPD Metro Division Facility (2016) offers eleven porcelain-enamel photographs of cultural artifacts that represent people, real and imagined, from various continents and eras and comment on philosophical, spiritual, legal and scientific constructions of race and racial difference.

Gonzales-Day's "Surface Tension" exhibition (Skirball Cultural Center, 2017) featured public artwork by other, often anonymous, artists—more than 140 images documenting street art throughout Los Angeles. The exhibition included a room-wide floor map tracing his documentary journey that served as an index to the works and explored the relationships between areas densely or sparsely populated with street art.

Wilshire/Fairfax Station, D Line Subway Extension Project: "Inspired by the concept of moving both body and mind, and by the station itself as an excavation site, the glass murals invite transit riders on a journey through time and across continents. Larger than life images of objects, drawn from the vast and diverse collections of the Los Angeles County Museum of Art, create an immersive environment that blurs the line between past and present. The artwork encourages viewers to think about museum collections and their connections to the outside world in unexpected ways."

== Awards and recognition ==
Gonzales-Day has been awarded fellowships from the John S. Guggenheim Foundation (2017) and California Community Foundation (2007), the Photographic Arts Council Prize, and grants from Creative Capital, the City of Los Angeles (COLA) (both 2012), and National Endowment for the Arts (1997, 1996). He has also been recognized with residencies from the Smithsonian Artist Research Fellowship (SARF) (2014), Terra Foundation for American Art (2013), Institut National d'Histoire de l'Art (INHA) (Paris, 2013, 2011), Getty Research Institute (2008–9), and Whitney Museum of American Art Independent Study Program (1992), among others.

His work belongs to the public art collections of MoMA, MOCA, LACMA, the Smithsonian American Art Museum, National Portrait Gallery, The National Gallery of Art, J Paul Getty Museum, The Art Institute of Chicago, L'Ecole des Beaux-Arts and Museum National d'Histoire Naturelle (Paris), Art Gallery of New South Wales, Norton Museum of Art, and Santa Barbara Museum of Art, among others, and many private collections. Monographs of Gonzales-Day's work include Lynching in the West: 1850-1935 (2006), Profiled (LACMA, 2011), and Surface Tension (2018), Ken Gonzales-Day: History's "Nevermade" (Edited by Amelia Jones, 2025).
