= General Education in a Free Society =

1945 Harvard report on the role of American general, public education

- Title page for General Education in a Free Society (1950)
- Author: Harvard Committee on the Objectives of a General Education in a Free Society, headed by James B. Conant
- Subject: Secondary education in the United States
- Publisher: Harvard University Press
- Publication date: 1945
- Pages: 268
- Text: General Education in a Free Society at Internet Archive

General Education in a Free Society, also known as the Harvard Redbook, is a 1945 Harvard University report on the importance of general education in American secondary and post-secondary schools. It is among the most important works in curriculum studies.

According to historian Frederick Rudolph, the Redbook called for "a submersion in tradition and heritage and some sense of common bond strong enough to bring unbridled ego and ambition under control."
