= Susan Rankaitis =

American painter

- Born: 1949 (age 76–77); Cambridge, Massachusetts
- Education: BFA, Painting and Photography, University of Southern California, School of Fine Arts (1971), MFA Painting, University of Illinois, Champaign-Urbana, School of Art and Design (1977)
- Known for: Painting, Photography, Drawing
- Movement: Abstract Photography, Conceptual Photography
- Website: http://www.susanrankaitis.com/

Susan Rankaitis (born 1949) is an American multimedia artist working primarily in painting, photography and drawing. Rankaitis began her career in the 1970s as an abstract painter. Visiting the Art Institute of Chicago while in graduate school, she had a transformative encounter with the photograms of the artist László Moholy-Nagy (1895–1946), whose abstract works of the 1920s and 1940s she saw as "both painting and photography." Rankaitis began to develop her own experimental methods for producing abstract and conceptual artworks related both to painting and photography.

Rankaitis draws on science in her work—particularly ideas generated through research in the fields of biology and neuroscience and she collaborates regularly with scientists on interdisciplinary projects.

== Education ==
- MFA, Painting and Photography, University of Southern California, School of Fine Arts (1977)
- BFA, Painting, University of Illinois, Champaign-Urbana, School of Art and Design (1971)

== Solo exhibitions ==
- 2017: Light Play: Experiments in Photography, 1970 to the Present, Los Angeles County Museum of Art
- 2017: Grey Matters, Robert Mann Gallery, New York, NY
- 2007: Limbicwork, Robert Mann Gallery, New York, NY
- 2005: Limbicwork: Pertaining to the Nature of Borders, Europos Parkas, Vilnius, Lithuania (outdoor)
- 2000: Susan Rankaitis: Drawn from Science, Museum of Photographic Arts, San Diego, CA
- 1998: Science as Art: Susan Rankaitis, Indiana University/Purdue University Cultural Arts Gallery, Indianapolis, IN
- 1997: Gold Science Ghost Drawings, Robert Mann Gallery, New York, NY
- 1994: Susan Rankaitis: Abstracting Science, Nature and Technology, Museum of Contemporary Photography, Chicago, IL
- 1992: DNA Series: Susan Rankaitis, Ruth Bloom Gallery, Santa Monica, CA
- 1991: Susan Rankaitis: Encounters, Center for Creative Photography, Tucson, AZ
- 1983: Susan Rankaitis: Inherent in Flight, Los Angeles County Museum of Art
- 1983: Susan Rankaitis: L'Avion, L'Avion, International Museum of Photography at the George Eastman House, Rochester, NY

== Academic career ==
Rankaitis has served since 1990 as Fletcher Jones Chair in Studio Art at Scripps College in Claremont, California.

== Public collections ==
- Art Institute of Chicago
- Museum of Contemporary Photography, Columbia College, Chicago, IL
- Los Angeles County Museum of Art
- Cantor Arts Center at Stanford University
- Princeton University Art Museum
- San Francisco Museum of Modern Art
- Smithsonian American Art Museum
- University of Maryland, Adele H. Stamp Student Union, Contemporary Art Purchasing Program
- Minneapolis Institute of Arts
