= Harvey Mansfield Sr. =

American political scientist and academic administrator

Harvey Claflin Mansfield Sr.
- Born: c. 1904; Cambridge, Massachusetts, U.S.
- Died: May 8, 1988 (aged 83–84)
- Known for: Managing editor of the American Political Science Review

Academic background
- Education: Cornell University (BA), Columbia University (MA, PhD)

Harvey Claflin Mansfield Sr. (c. 1904 – May 8, 1988) was an American political scientist and academic administrator specializing in public law and government. He was Ruggles Professor Emeritus of Public Law and Government at Columbia University and served as managing editor of the American Political Science Review (APSR) from 1956 to 1965.

== Early life, education, and personal life ==
Mansfield was born in Cambridge, Massachusetts. He earned a bachelor's degree from Cornell University and completed both a master's degree and a doctorate at Columbia University.

Mansfield was married and had four children. His son Harvey C. Mansfield Jr. became a prominent political philosopher and longtime professor of government at Harvard University.

== Academic career ==
Mansfield spent much of his academic career at Columbia University, where he taught political science with a focus on public law, constitutional government, and American political institutions. He held the Ruggles Professorship of Public Law and Government, one of the university's senior chairs in the field, and was designated Ruggles Professor Emeritus upon retirement.

In addition to his service at Columbia, Mansfield taught at Yale University, where he was a dissertation advisor to Robert Dahl, and served as chair of the Department of Political Science at Ohio State University from 1947 to 1959. During his tenure at Ohio State, the department included younger scholars such as Harry V. Jaffa.

=== American Political Science Review ===
From 1956 to 1965, Mansfield served as managing editor of the American Political Science Review, the flagship journal of the American Political Science Association. During his editorship, the journal maintained a significant place for traditional political theory during the postwar rise of behavioralism in political science. Under Mansfield's editorial leadership, the APSR published influential essays by Leo Strauss, including two articles on John Locke that later shaped the intellectual development of Mansfield's son.

== Scholarship ==
Mansfield authored several books in political science. His scholarship and editorial leadership placed him within the mainstream of mid-twentieth-century American political science, particularly in the study of public law and constitutional government.

According to later recollections by his son, Mansfield was “a New Deal Democrat, a liberal who had an aversion to the Left.” This description situates him within a mid-century liberal tradition supportive of New Deal reforms while opposed to communism and more radical currents of left-wing politics.

== Death ==
Mansfield died on May 8, 1988, in New York City, at the age of 83. At the time of his death, he was Ruggles Professor Emeritus of Public Law and Government at Columbia University.
