= Gary Smith (economist) =

American economist (born 1945)

- Born: 1945 (age 80–81)

Academic background
- Education: Harvey Mudd College, Yale University
- Influences: James Tobin

Academic work
- Discipline: Economics, Research in macroeconomics, financial inefficiencies, and torturing data
- Institutions: Pomona College

Gary Nance Smith (born 1945) is the Fletcher Jones Professor of Economics at Pomona College. His research on financial markets statistical reasoning, and artificial intelligence, often involves stock market anomalies, statistical fallacies, and the misuse of data have been widely cited.

== Early history and education ==
Smith earned his B.S. in mathematics from Harvey Mudd College and enrolled in Yale University's graduate economics program. After taking classes from James Tobin and William Brainard, he decided to focus on macroeconomics. He earned his Ph.D. in economics from Yale in 1971 and was hired as an assistant professor. In a demonstration of the law of comparative advantage, Smith taught the first-year graduate course in macroeconomics while Tobin taught the first-year graduate course in microeconomics.

== Notable contributions ==
=== The housing market ===
Smith has been a lifelong proponent of value investing, buying stocks based on the cash they generate, instead of trying to predict short-term movements in stock prices. The same principles apply to real estate. From a financial standpoint, the decision to buy a house should be based on the cash flow—the rental savings minus the mortgage payments, property taxes, and other expenses associated with home ownership—not guesses about future home prices. All real estate is local, so the answer to the question of whether a house is a good financial investment varies from place to place.

A widely cited Brookings paper, co-authored with his wife Margaret H. Smith, applied this reasoning to ten U. S. metropolitan areas in 2005 and concluded that there was not a nationwide real estate bubble. In cities like Indianapolis and Dallas, residential real estate looked like a terrific long-run investment in that the rent savings were much larger than the expenses. A follow-up study by Smith found that, not only in these 10 metropolitan areas, but in cities throughout California, areas with relatively low price/rent ratios were the most resistant to the drop in home prices between 2005 and 2010.

=== Regression to the mean ===
When intellectual ability, athletic prowess, and other traits are measured imperfectly, those who seem to be the most able are more likely to have been overrated than underrated. Their subsequent performance consequently tends to regress by being closer to the mean than previously. This little-understood phenomenon of regression reaches into nearly every aspect of life, from academic achievements to athletic performance to corporate profits to the campaign trail. It happens with students, athletes, CEOs, politicians, and soul mates. The baseball star having an MVP season one year is likely to do worse the next. The hot company will eventually cool down; popular presidents will in time see a plunge in the polls. And vice versa. Smith has investigated regression in education, sports, forecasting, business, and investing.

=== Stock market anomalies ===
The efficient-market hypothesis holds that stock prices take into account all relevant information, so that no investor can beat the market by taking advantage of others' ignorance. Evidence that contradicts the efficient market hypothesis has become known as anomalies. In addition to stock market anomalies created by an insufficient appreciation of regression to the mean, Smith has found that a portfolio of the stocks identified each year by Fortune magazine as America's most admired companies outperformed the market, contradicting the efficient market hypothesis. He also found that a portfolio of stocks with clever, eye-catching ticker symbols—for example, LUV (Southwest Airlines), MOO (United Stockyards), and GEEK (Internet America)—beat the market, again contradicting the efficient market hypothesis. In another study, Smith found that the U. S. stock market has done better on sunny days than on cloudy days in New York City even though daily fluctuations in New York's cloudiness do not affect the fundamental value of the stocks being traded.

Although not a stock market anomaly, another Smith paper found further evidence of the cognitive biases that lead investors astray: experienced poker players tend to be less cautious after large losses, evidently attempting to recoup their losses quickly. If investors are like poker players, their behavior might well be affected by large gains and losses, for example, making otherwise imprudent long-shot investments with the hope of offsetting a prior loss cheaply.

=== "Hot hands" ===
Gilovich, Vallone, and Tversky's analysis of basketball data debunked the common perception that players sometimes have "hot hands". In fact, they found that the probability of making a shot was usually somewhat lower after having made shots than after having missed shots. However, data from basketball games have several confounding influences. A player's two successive shots might be taken 30 seconds apart, 5 minutes apart, in different halves of a game, or even in different games. Another problem is that a player who makes several shots may be more willing to take difficult shots than is a player who has been missing shots. In addition, the opposing team may guard a player differently when he is perceived to be hot or cold.

Smith analyzed bowling and horseshoe pitching—sports that do not have these confounding influences—and found evidence of hot hands. Players were more likely to do well after having done well than after having done poorly. The observed fluctuations in performance are not nearly as large as many people think, but are large enough to be the difference between victory and defeat.

=== Death postponement ===
In his early statistics textbooks, Smith cited a study claiming that famous people can postpone death until after the celebration of their birthdays. Several of Smith's students attempted to replicate this finding, and could not. Puzzled by this, Smith and another student (Heather Royer, now a professor herself) reexamined the birthday/deathday data and found that the author had lumped together all deaths that occurred during the birth month, not distinguishing those that occurred before the birthday from those that occurred afterward. Deaths that occurred during the birth month were counted as having been postponed until after the birthday celebration. There is no logical reason for this bizarre accounting other than it gave the results the authors wanted.

Royer and Smith found that of the 26 famous people who died during their birth month, 13 died before their birthdays, 1 died on his birthday, and 12 died after their birthdays. The 26 people who died close to their birthdays were completely unsuccessful in postponing death. Royer and Smith also separated deaths into 30 days before the birthday, 30 days after, and so on, and found no evidence that people are able to postpone death.

These discoveries led Smith to re-examine studies that allegedly showed people postponing death to celebrate Jewish celebrations and the Harvest Moon Festival. He found that these studies had also massaged the data to support the desired conclusion.

=== Torturing data ===
Smith then turned to several other published studies that seemed implausible. Each illustrated Ronald Coase's dictum, "If you torture the data long enough, it will confess."

Smith's debunked claims that Asian-Americans are prone to have fatal hearts attacks on the fourth day of the month (the Baskerville effect), Chinese-Americans are more vulnerable to those diseases that Chinese astrology and traditional Chinese medicine associate with their birth years, people whose names have positive initials (such as ACE or VIP) live longer than do people with negative initials (such as PIG or DIE), people whose first names begin with the letter D die relatively young, baseball players who are elected to the Hall of Fame have a shortened life expectancy, baseball players born in August are prone to commit suicide, and hurricanes are more deadly if they have female name.

=== Artificial intelligence and data mining ===
The scientific method is based on rigorous tests of falsifiable hypotheses. Data mining instead puts data before theory by searching for statistical patterns. Sometimes, theories are made up after a pattern is found (HARKing: Hypothesizing After the Results are Known); other times, it is assumed that theories are not needed.

Artificial intelligence and machine learning systems, for example, often rely on data-mining algorithms to construct models with little or no human guidance. Smith argues that computers are not intelligent in any meaningful sense of the word, and should not be trusted to select models for making important decisions: "The real danger today is not that computers are smarter than us, but that we think computers are smarter than us".

A plethora of patterns are inevitable in large data sets and computer algorithms have no effective way of assessing whether data-mined patterns are truly useful or just meaningless coincidences. While data mining sometimes discovers useful relationships, Smith argues that the data deluge has caused the number of possible patterns that can be discovered relative to the number that are genuinely useful to grow exponentially—which makes it increasingly unlikely that discovered patterns are useful. This is the paradox of big bata: data mining is most seductive when there are a large number of variables to analyze, but the inevitable coincidental patterns in large data sets make it more likely that the statistical relationships discovered by data mining are spurious.

== Publications ==
=== Selected books ===
- Smith, Gary, and Smith, Margaret. (2008). Houseonomics, Upper Saddle River, New Jersey:Pearson/Financial Times. ISBN 978-0-13-713378-9
- Smith, Gary. (2015). Essential Statistics, Regression, and Econometrics, Ann Arbor, Michigan: Academic Press, second edition. ISBN 978-0-12-803459-0
- Smith, Gary. (2014). Standard Deviations: Flawed Assumptions, Tortured Data, and Other Ways to Lie With Statistics, New York: Overlook, London: Duckworth. China: Ginkgo. ISBN 978-1-46-831102-0
- Smith, Gary. (2016). What the Luck?: The Surprising Role of Luck in Our Everyday Lives, New York: Overlook, London: Duckworth, China: Shanghai Soothe Cultural Media Co. ISBN 978-1-4683-1375-8
- Smith, Gary. (2017). Money Machine: The Surprising Simple Power of Value Investing, New York: AMACOM, ISBN 978-0-8144-3856-5
- Smith, Gary. (2018). The AI Delusion, Oxford: Oxford University Press, ISBN 978-01-9882-430-5
- Smith, Gary, and Cordes, Jay (2019), The 9 Pitfalls of Data Science, (Winner of the 2020 Prose Award for Popular Science and Popular Mathematics), Oxford: Oxford University Press, ISBN 978-01-9884-439-6
- Smith, Gary, and Cordes, Jay (2020), The Phantom Pattern Problem: The Mirage of Big Data, Oxford: Oxford University Press, ISBN 9780198864165

=== Highly cited papers ===
- Smith, Margaret Hwang, Smith, Gary. (2006). "Bubble, Bubble, Where's the Housing Bubble?", presented at the Brookings Panel on Economic Activity, March 30–31, 2006; subsequently published in Brookings Papers on Economic Activity, 2006 (1), 1-67.
- Smith, Gary. (1998). "Learning Statistics by Doing Statistics", Journal of Statistics Education, 6 (3), www.amstat.org/publications/jse/v6n3/smith.html.
- Backus, David, Brainard, William C, Smith, Gary, Tobin, James. (1980). "A Model of U.S. Financial and Nonfinancial Economic Behavior", Journal of Money, Credit, and Banking, 12 (2), 259–293.
- Smith, Gary, Campbell, Frank. (1980). "A Critique of Some Ridge Regression Methods", Journal of the American Statistical Association, with discussion and rejoinder, 75 (369), 74–81. (Journal of the American Statistical Association invited Theory and Methods Paper for the 1979 meetings of the American Statistical Association) JSTOR 2287386
- Sallis, Robert E.; Jones, Kirk; Sunshine, Sam; Smith, Gary; Simon, Lauren. (2001), "Comparing Sports Injuries in Men and Women", International Journal of Sports Medicine, 22 (6), 420–423.
- Anderson, Jeff, Smith, Gary. (2006). "A Great Company Can be a Great Investment", Financial Analysts Journal, 62 (4), 86–93. JSTOR 4480762
- Dorsey-Palmateer, Reid, Smith, Gary. (2004). "Bowlers' Hot Hands", The American Statistician, 58 (1), 38-45.
- Tucker Thole, Robert; Sallis, Robert E.; Rubin, Aaron L.; Smith, Gary. (2001). "Exercise-Induced Bronchospasm Prevalence in Collegiate Cross-Country Runners", Medicine & Science in Sports & Exercise, 33 (10), 1641–1646.
- Smith, Gary. (1975). "Pitfalls in Financial Model Building: A Clarification", The American Economic Review, 65 (3), 510–516.
- Smith, Gary, Brainard, William C. (1976). "The Value of A Priori Information in Estimating a Financial Model", Journal of Finance, 31 (5), 1299–1322.
- Smith, Gary (2003). "Horseshoe Pitchers' Hot Hands", Psychonomic Bulletin & Review, 10 (3), 753-758.
- Smith, Gary; Levere, Michael; Kurtzman, Robert. (2009). "Poker Player Behavior After Big Wins and Big Losses", Management Science, 55 (9), 1547–1555.
- Lee, Marcus; Smith, Gary (2002). "Regression to the Mean and Football Wagers", Journal of Behavioral Decision Making, 15 (4), 329–342.

== Personal life ==
Gary Smith is married to Margaret Hwang Smith and has six children, Joshua, Joanna, Chaska, Cory, Cameron, and Claire.
