= Marcos Villatoro =

American poet and novelist

Marcos McPeek Villatoro is a writer from the United States. He is the author of six novels, two collections of poetry and a memoir, and the producer/director of the documentary "Tamale Road: A Memoir from El Salvador." He has written essays for National Public Radio and PBS. He resides in Los Angeles.

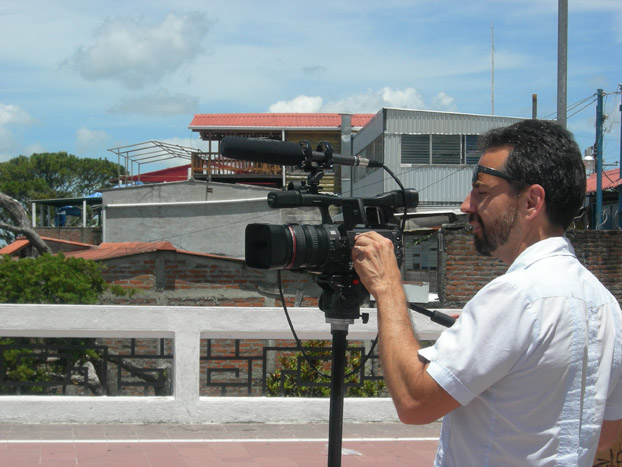
Marcos shoots a scene for Camino Tamalero (Tamale Road).

== Biography ==
McPeek Villatoro was born on February 20, 1962, in San Francisco, California. His mother is from El Salvador, his father from the Appalachian Mountains of east Tennessee. He lived the first three years of his life in the Mission District of San Francisco, until his family moved to his father's hometown of Rogersville, Tennessee, where he spent most of his life until 1980. In August of that year he moved to Davenport, Iowa, where he attended St. Ambrose University as a seminarian for the Roman Catholic Church.

In January 1982 he met his future wife, Michelle Menster (a local Iowan). He left the seminary in May of that year. He and Menster married in May 1984.

After graduation from St. Ambrose University, McPeek Villatoro entered the Masters Program in English Literature at the University of Iowa. He graduated in May 1985. In November of that year he and his wife moved to Nicaragua with the nonprofit program Witness for Peace, where they reported war atrocities in the northern department of Nueva Segovia, on the Honduran border.

In 1986 the couple moved back to the United States, where they worked in an environmental education camp in the Tennessee Smokey Mountains. In 1988 they joined the missionary program Maryknoll. They moved to Guatemala and worked there until 1991.

That same year McPeek Villatoro worked as administrator and fundraiser for the Glenmary Co-Missioners. The couple moved to northern Alabama, where his wife worked as an advocate of the growing migrant farm community.

In 1996 McPeek Villatoro was accepted into the Iowa Writers' Workshop, where he graduated with an MFA in 1998.

That same year he, Michelle and their four children moved to Los Angeles, California, where McPeek Villatoro was hired as the Fletcher Jones Endowed Chair in Creative Writing at Mount St. Mary's University, Los Angeles. He teaches literature and writing.

== Publications ==
=== Novels ===
- A Fire in the Earth (1998)
- The Holy Spirit of My Uncle's Cojones (1999)
- Home Killings: A Romilia Chacón Novel (2001)
- Minos: A Romilia Chacón Novel (2004)
- A Venom Beneath the Skin: A Romilia Chacón Novel (2007)
- Blood Daughters: A Romilia Chacón Novel (2011)

=== Poetry ===
- They Say That I Am Two (1998)
- On Tuesday, When the Homeless Disappeared (2004)

=== Memoir ===
- Walking to La Milpa (1999)
- Speak of It (2023)

=== Essays ===
- NPR's "Day to Day" (2007–2009)
- KCET's "SoCal Connected," Los Angeles (2008–2010)
- PBS's "Need to Know" (2011)

=== Film ===
- Tamale Road: A Memoir from El Salvador (2012)

== Awards ==
- Latino Literary Hall of Fame (2000)
- Best Book of 2001 (Home Killings), Los Angeles Times (2001)
- Golden Mike Award (2009)
- Los Angeles Emmy Award (2009)
- Los Angeles Emmy Award (2010)
