= List of killings by law enforcement officers in the United States, August 2014 =

This is a list of people reported killed by non-military law enforcement officers in the United States in August 2014, whether in the line of duty or not, and regardless of reason or method. The listing documents the occurrence of a death, making no implications regarding wrongdoing or justification on the part of the person killed or officer involved. Killings are arranged by date of the incident that caused death. Different death dates, if known, are noted in the description. The table below lists 104 people.

== August 2014 ==
Date	Name (Age) of Deceased	Race	State (City)	Description
2014-08-31	Justin Burch (21)	White	Hattiesburg, Mississippi	Responding to a domestic violence call, the Marion County Sheriff's office says "a deputy gave Burch numerous commands to drop a firearm, but the situation escalated" and the deputy shot and killed Burch.
2014-08-31	Royal Shawn Bingamen (42)	White	Reno, Nevada	According to media reports, a chain of events, triggered by a pharmacy robbery and a vehicle chase, ended with Reno police fatally shooting a suspect.
2014-08-31	Jose Walter Garza (30)	Hispanic	Laredo, Texas	The Laredo Police Department said they received a report of a man armed with a weapon at a truck stop. "The encounter resulted in an officer-involved shooting," according to the release, which did not specify if more than one officer opened fire. Surveillance video from the truck stop shows Garza after he was shot at by several officers, over 80 times. A cousin said police shot Garza so many times he "had no face." "He wouldn’t get aggressive, he wouldn’t hurt anyone," cousin Andrea Martinez said. "He’s a good kid. "Why didn’t they shoot him in the leg, or the arm or something? Not like that." Garza had schizophrenia.
2014-08-31	Eugene N. Turner III (28)	Black	Kansas City, Kansas	Kansas Highway Patrol responded to reports of a man wandering the streets with a gun. KHP found an armed individual a block south of initial reports. Eugene Turner fired several shots at KHP who returned fire, killing the suspect.
2014-08-30	Johnston, Stephen (56)		Seattle, Washington	According to Seattle Police, a man had been firing a weapon outside of his home. When officers arrived, the man with a weapon in hand, retreated into the house but then came back out and fired on officers. Two officers with rifles returned fire."Seattle police shoot, kill man after brief standoff in Queen Anne", Seattle Post-Intelligencer, August 31, 2014.
2014-08-29	Jeremy Lewis (33)	Black	Orlando, Florida	Orange County Sheriff Jerry Demings said Lewis pointed a gun at deputies who were serving a warrant at an Orlando apartment complex. At least two deputies shot Lewis several times outside the doorway, and he died from his injuries. He was identified to media at the scene.
2014-08-29	Erik Charles Lebak (32)	White	Redding, California	When two Shasta County Sheriff's deputies responded to a call for help about a suicidal man they heard gunshots inside the home. A short time later a confrontation ensued between the man and two deputies, and the man was shot and killed. Lebak was the son of retired Redding police captain Chuck Lebak, officers said.
2014-08-29	Jayson Matthew Withers (26)	White	Pendleton, Oregon	A corrections officer at the Eastern Oregon Correctional Institution shot and killed Withers after he and another prisoner wouldn't stop attacking a third inmate. The guard fired "to prevent imminent serious bodily injury to an inmate being assaulted." The guard's name was not yet released.
2014-08-29	Michael John O'Connell (44)	White	Littlefield, Arizona	Mohave County Sheriff's Office says deputies spotted a motorcycle traveling without a rear license plate. Deputies attempted to stop the rider, who then abandoned his vehicle and ran into the desert. Deputies found him in some brush and used a Taser twice after he allegedly became combative. The suspect stopped breathing while being led in handcuffs to a patrol car.
2014-08-29	Enebelio Garcia (45)	Hispanic	Guadalupe County, Texas	Guadalupe County Sheriff Arnold Zwicke said Enebelio Garcia of New Braunfels was shot and killed by deputies after reportedly trying to attack them with a carpenter’s hatchet.
2014-08-28	Villarreal, Raymond (43)		Corpus Christi, Texas	San Patricio County Sheriff's deputies responded to a call a man had a gun and was going to kill himself. According to a media report, deputies found the man in a pickup in brush behind his house. The man seemed excited and agitated, and at some point he got out of his vehicle with a pistol in his hand, Sheriff Leroy Moody said. At some point, he said, the man fired a shot and deputies returned fire, killing him.
2014-08-28	Mark Jeffery Sharpe (54)	Unknown race	Sutter County, California	Sutter County deputies responded to a request for help for an attempted suicide or assault. Police say they saw a woman and a man armed with a pistol inside the home. The man did not comply with orders to move away from the pistol, so deputies fired a stun gun at the suspect. The suspect then charged at deputies, who responded with gunfire.
2014-08-28	Chaz Michael Havenor (21)	White	Minnesota (Ramsey)	Police officers Jerad Dixon and Richard Webb shot and fatally wounded Havenor outside a day-care center after he pointed a gun at them, said Anoka County Sheriff’s Cmdr. Paul Sommer. Havenor was shot as he ran away from a "suspicious vehicle" parked outside a daycare center. Sommer said workers at the center called police about the vehicle, in which three men were sitting. When Dixon and Webb arrived, Havenor ran from the car, pointing a gun at them, Sommer said. They fired on Havenor, fatally wounding him.
2014-08-28	Terry Sellars (31)	White	Manatee County, Florida	Mother called for help after her son attacked her with a telephone book and then choked her. Manatee County Sheriff Brad Steube described the scene, "Before the three deputies got out of the car, the son bolted out the front door with a very large samurai sword and charged at one of the deputies. [Sgt. Brady McCabe], in backing up, fired several shots at the son."
2014-08-28	Guillermo Culajay Canas (36)	Hispanic	St. Paul, Minnesota	Police officer Joseph Sandquist shot and killed a man in a confrontation that one witness said involved the suspect throwing rocks, punching an officer and charging at the cops. Police Chief Tom Smith, explaining why the officer shot the man whose weapons were rocks, said, "You don’t have to always have a firearm or knife to hurt somebody."
2014-08-27	John J. Rogers (61)	Native American	Bloomfield, New Mexico	Police responded to a domestic dispute call and as they approached the house they say they heard shots fired. Police returned fire killing Rogers. His family says he was not armed, the shooting was unprovoked and there was no "dispute." Subsequent police investigation concludes it was justified, and that according to a report Rogers reached into his truck, despite warnings from the officer, and pulled out a pistol.
2014-08-27	Freddie LeBlanc (48)	White	Albany, Louisiana	Deputies responded to a suicidal man with a gun. WAFB reports, "an incident ensued and the man was shot and killed by deputy rounds."
2014-08-27	Sergio Ramos (18)	Hispanic	Dallas, Texas	Police say Sergio Ramos shot and killed 25-year-old Joseph Roling during a robbery and car chase. An accomplice and witnesses took the car and Ramos left on foot. Off-duty Dallas police officer Jose Gamez followed the car, stopped behind them "and began asking questions." Ramos got in the car. Seeing a gun in Ramos' pocket, Gamez told him not to touch it. Ramos went for the gun and Gamez shot and killed him.
2014-08-26	Cortez Washington (32)	Black	Omaha, Nebraska	Restaurant robbery suspect Cortez Washington and COPS television show audio technician Bryce Dion were killed by police.
2014-08-26	Bryce Dion (38)	White	Omaha, Nebraska	Restaurant robbery suspect Cortez Washington and COPS television show audio technician Bryce Dion were killed by police.
2014-08-26	Kerry Wesson (45)	Black	Lynwood, California	Wesson allegedly shot and wounded an unnamed Los Angeles County Sheriff’s detective in Lynwood. Wesson was later shot and killed by SWAT deputies when he exited his residence while holding a semiautomatic pistol.
2014-08-25	Guadalupe Esquivel (51)	Hispanic	Lubbock, Texas	Police say an officer responded to a report of Esquivel with a gun threatening to shoot a woman. The officer arrived and confronted him, who then turned and appeared to reach for his gun. The officer fired several rounds, striking and killing the man. The shots were fired within 15 seconds of the officer's first contact with Esquivel, police said.
2014-08-25	Joshua Crawford (29)	White	Grand Junction, Colorado	Grand Junction Police Department received a call to remove Crawford from a home on Grand Avenue. Details on what led to the shooting have yet to be released. (8/27/2014),
2014-08-25	Randy Matheny (31)	White	Dingess, West Virginia	Police say Randy Matheny was involved in an auto accident and fired a shot before police arrived, then went home with his baby. Troopers say when they approached Matheny he lifted his gun and pointed it at troopers giving them no choice but to shoot him.
2014-08-25	Steven Lashone Douglas (29)	Black	Dallas, Texas	Police responded to a domestic violence call on August 23. On the 25th, Douglas chased down and rammed the car of his children’s mother and then took two children in his truck, police say. Hours later, officers chased him down, and witnesses told investigators that he pointed a pistol at Officer Rogelio Moreno, who shot and killed him.
2014-08-25	Mark Salazar (22)	Hispanic	Oklahoma City, Oklahoma	K-9 Sgt. Ryan Stark fatally shot a burglary suspect who stabbed at his dog after it was set to attack him. The dog later died.
2014-08-24	Timothy Shad Griffis (41)	White	Lake City, Florida	The police report said Griffis was acting strange and wouldn't come out of a shed, saying he would kill Deputy Bradley Carpenter. "After he failed to comply with the requests to come out he was eventually tased and taken into custody." Handcuffed, Griffis began having trouble breathing and then stopped altogether. Carpenter took the cuffs off and administered CPR, but Griffis died later at a hospital.
2014-08-24	Stephen Andrew McMilon (52)	White	Medford, Oregon	Police responded twice to calls, second time contacting McMilon carrying a shotgun, two handguns, and a "substantial" amount of ammunition, according to an agency press release. Four officers responded; McMilon menaced officers with a shotgun. Two minutes later, he fired at least one round at an officer. Police shot back and killed him.
2014-08-24	Joseph Jennings (18)	White	Ottawa, Kansas	Jennings had just been released from a psychiatric hospital three hours before two Ottawa police officers shot and killed him.
2014-08-24	Mauricio Herrera-Garcia (39)	Hispanic	Phoenix, Arizona	Herrera-Garcia left the scene of an auto accident and then fired several shots into the air when the accident victim tried to contact him. According to police, Phoenix Police Department SWAT team members fatally shot him after he pointed a handgun at an officer as they tried to apprehend him.
2014-08-24	Roshad McIntosh (18)	Black	Chicago, Illinois	A man was fatally shot in a police-involved shooting on the near west side August 24. Police recovered a 9 mm handgun at the scene.
2014-08-24	Desean Pittman (20)	Black	Chicago, Illinois	Police on foot patrol say they saw Desean Pittman shoot and kill 22-year-old Amelio Johnson. A police officer fired and fatally struck Pittman, police said.
2014-08-23	Hernan Milton Ossorio (61)	Hispanic	Ellicott City, Maryland	Authorities said suicidal man had threatened to kill occupants of his home in Ellicott City and then confronted Police officers Russell DiAngelo and Susannah Raff with a knife. They shot and killed him.,
2014-08-23	Paula, Briant (26)		Methuen, Massachusetts	Lowell police officer Eric Wayne was charged August 23 with motor vehicle homicide and drunken driving after Briant Paula was killed and his sister injured.
2014-08-23	Anthony Lamar Brown (39)	Black	West Palm Beach, Florida	Responding to a complaint of a bike robbery, police say Brown tussled with West Palm Beach police officer Jason Rafael Barquin, deflected a Taser strike and opened fire at Barquin who shot and killed Brown.
2014-08-22	Vernicia Woodard (26)	Black	Atlanta, Georgia	Atlanta officer Tahreem Zeus Rana, 23, was arrested August 28 on the charges of murder, arson and kidnapping. He was arrested attempting to get on a flight to Mexico. Police said Woodard was shot multiple times and set on fire in an apparent attempt to destroy evidence.
2014-08-22	Alex Alvarado (38)	Hispanic	San Bernardino, California	Officer Gabriel Garcia shot in the head during a "protracted gun battle," trainee returned fire and killed shooter
2014-08-20	Darren Friedman (45)	White	Ellicott City, Maryland	Officer Daniel Young and Officer Lara Bradshaw responded to a suicide in progress call shot and killed Friedman in his bedroom.
2014-08-20	Arvel Douglas Williams (30)	Black	Perry Hall, Maryland	Harford County sheriff's deputies used Tasers on 30-year-old Arvel Douglas Williams "in an effort to safely place [him] under arrest," Baltimore County Police said Thursday. Police did not say how many deputies used Tasers, or how many times Williams was stunned.
2014-08-19	David Ellis (29)	Black	Philadelphia, Pennsylvania	Man killed in police shoot out. Officer Steve Korpalski, a 14-year-veteran, grazed in the left side of his head by a bullet.
2014-08-19	Miranda Michelle Guy (28)	White	Tennessee (Harriman)	Harriman Police Lt. Dan Schneider and Roane County Deputy Chris White shot and killed Guy, saying later she was a burglary suspect. Ninth Judicial District Attorney General Russell Johnson called the shooting "justified" two days later.
2014-08-19	Darius Cole-Garrit (21)	Black	Illinois (Chicago)	A man on a bike was fatally shot by police on the Far South Side after he aimed a gun at officers, authorities said.
2014-08-19	Maria Fernanda Godinez (22)	Hispanic	Florida (Orlando)	A suspect (Kody Roach) and officers engaged in a shootout outside a bar in downtown Orlando. The suspect and a police officer suffered injuries. An innocent bystander woman (Godinez) was struck by an officer's bullet and died. 17 other bystanders were shot by police.
2014-08-19	Chad A. Leichhardt (40)	White	Kansas (Haysville)	A man was fatally shot by police after officers arrived at an apartment complex responding to a domestic disturbance. Reportedly, Leichardt was wielding a knife and refused police commands to drop it.
2014-08-19	Kajieme Powell (25)	Black	Missouri (St. Louis)	A 25-year-old man with a knife was shot by two officers. The man was reported saying that he wanted to die; family report he was "mentally challenged". The shooting took place three miles away from the site of the shooting of Michael Brown in Ferguson, and occurred during Ferguson unrest.
2014-08-18	Jeffrey Towe (53)	White	California (Woodland)	Man lunged at officers with a knife and was shot. Family reported to media a long history of mental illness.
2014-08-18	Bukowiecki, Richard (47)		Norwalk, California	Bukowiecki committed suicide in a motel room. He had served on the Cerritos College campus police force for 26 years and was chief for the past eight. In 2012 he was awarded Outstanding Classified Manager.
2014-08-18	Andre Maurice Jones (37)	Black	Los Angeles, California	Jones was killed by the LAPD SWAT team after a "rolling gun battle". Police accused driver Avel Jowan Turks of attempted murder; an officer was badly wounded.
2014-08-18	Luther Lathron Walker (38)	Black	Los Angeles, California	A SWAT team shot and killed an armed man who had been holding his girlfriend hostage for hours August 18 at an apartment complex in Bellflower. Negotiators were in contact with the unidentified man before the shooting occurred, police said. He was pronounced dead at the scene.
2014-08-17	Steven R. Piirainen (52)	White	Maine (Mexico)	State Trooper Paul Casey and Mexico Reserve Officer Dean Benson stopped Piirainen, who was suspected of stealing a truck. Piirainen was killed after an exchange of gunfire.
2014-08-17	Levon Leroy Love (44)	Black	San Antonio, Texas	Love was found passed out in his car and naked from the waist down, police said. Paramedics were called, but Love resisted efforts to load him into an ambulance and jumped back into his car instead, police said. He started to drive away with the gurney dragging behind him until he crashed into a pickup. Police said Love would not calm down as they tried to detain him after the crash, so they deployed Tasers.
2014-08-16	Travis Donald Wegener (28)	White	Knoxville, Tennessee	Police Cadet Michael William Little was shot and killed after he gunned down Travis Donald Wegener, 28, at the home of Little’s ex-girlfriend, police said. Little also shot his ex-girlfriend and her mother, seriously injuring her mother. Ex-girlfriend's brother, Joshua Womack shot and killed Little.
2014-08-16	Frederick R. Miller (38)	Black	Fort Washington, Maryland	Prince George's County Police believe Miller shot two adult family members. Police found him driving in a Maryland suburb of Washington, DC; Pursued Miller and killed him. Miller took the life of his 3 year old daughter, Laila, during the pursuit.
2014-08-14	Alvin Curtis Jennings (61)	White	Davenport, Iowa	Jennings reportedly had a knife and charged police. According to his family, Jennings suffered from mental and physical disabilities.
2014-08-14	Dante Parker (36)	Black	Victorville, California	Sheriff's deputies found Parker riding a bicycle away from the residence and tried to stop him, but he appeared to be under the influence of unknown substances and became "uncooperative and combative", officials said. Parker allegedly fought with a female deputy and left bruises on her arms. The deputy used a Taser on Parker "multiple times" during a struggle, officials said. A second deputy helped handcuff Parker and place him in the backseat of a patrol unit, when they saw that he was sweating and breathing heavily, authorities said.
2014-08-14	Sonny Wagner (52)	White	Newton, Kansas	A single officer responded to a domestic violence call, met Wagner at the front door of his home. The officer reported he told Wagner to put the knife down, but he refused. Wagner then raised the knife and walked toward the officer. The officer then fired his service weapon twice, hitting Wagner in the chest.
2014-08-14	Diana Showman (19)	White	San Jose, California	A woman was fatally shot by police after she pointed a cordless drill designed to appear as an Uzi firearm. The officer who shot Showman, Wakana Okuma, was CIT trained. Showman had bipolar disorder.
2014-08-13	Jacinto Zavala (21)	Hispanic	Greeley, Colorado	Zavala was shot by police. Family told the media Zavala was a veteran and had PTSD.
2014-08-13	Michelle Cusseaux (50)	Black	Phoenix, Arizona	Michelle Cusseaux, a woman with mental illness was shot and killed by Phoenix Sgt. Percy Dupra after her family and mental health workers called for police assistance.
2014-08-13	Michael Louis Vargas (40)	Hispanic	Houston, Texas	When officers pulled over a driver suspected of driving a stolen pickup, the driver raised a gun at them. Officer Alton Baker then shot and killed the driver. Houston police officer John Calhoun was injured.
2014-08-13	Reagan Lee Jones (35)	White	Muscle Shoals, Alabama	Reagan Jones barricaded himself in his apartment at Arbor Village Apartments after shooting and injuring his sister. Jones fired a high-powered military-style rifle at officers, and a Florence SWAT officer fired two rounds at Jones, killing him. According to media reports, Jones was angry about a mental health appointment.
2014-08-13	Corey Levert Tanner (24)	Black	Florida (Bunnell)	
2014-08-12	DeVito, James (59)		Suffern, New York	DeVito was hit by off-duty NYPD officer Richard Christopher who was driving under the influence of alcohol. Both drivers were killed.
2014-08-12	Gabriel Lopez-Gonzalez (22)	Hispanic	San Fernando, California	Police shot and killed Lopez-Gonzalez who, according to media reports, had held his girlfriend hostage. Online cell phone footage shows police barrage.
2014-08-12	Rick Ronald Pifer (54)	White	Michigan (Fairfield Township)	Pifer reportedly pointed a shotgun at police. According to media reports, Pifer suffered from mental illness.
2014-08-11	Brennan, Daniel (51)		New York (Palenville)	Parole officer Mroczek killed his estranged wife and boyfriend (Pammi Mroczek, aged 49, and her boyfriend, Daniel Brennan, aged 51); Mroczek committed suicide after a police chase.
2014-08-11	Mroczek, Pammi (49)		New York (Palenville)	Parole officer Mroczek killed his estranged wife and boyfriend (Pammi Mroczek, aged 49, and her boyfriend, Daniel Brennan, aged 51); Mroczek committed suicide after a police chase.
2014-08-11	Ezell Ford (25)	Black	Los Angeles, California	Ford was shot and killed by LAPD officers Sharlton Wampler and Antonio Villegas, who say Ford was acting suspiciously when they engaged him in a physical altercation. He allegedly knocked one officer to the ground and was trying to get his gun when his partner fired two shots. The officer on the ground pulled out a backup gun and shot Ford in the back. According to witnesses, Ford was unarmed and on the ground when killed. According to his family, Ford suffered from mental illness, and the officers knew him and knew of that. The police chief and inspector general recommended that the Police Commission find the shooting justified on the basis that Ford was trying to grab the officer's gun. The police commission rejected that recommendation and found that Wampler was wrong to use deadly force but found against Villegas only on drawing his weapon early in the confrontation.
2014-08-11	Jose Manuel Gonzalez (18)	Hispanic	Texas (Dallas)	Neighbors told media Gonzalez attacked his mother, father and grandmother. Officers saw Gonzalez with two knives. The teen refused to drop the knives so Senior Cpl. Kevin Gladden shot and then Tased him. Police said he died at the hospital.
2014-08-11	Eddie Davis (67)	Black	DeKalb, Texas	Officers responding to a disturbance call at residence were fired upon Eddie Davis who wounded one officer in the leg. Gun shots were returned and suspect suffered fatal injuries.
2014-08-11	Torrez Harris (52)	Black	Canton, Mississippi	Harris shot and killed his step-daughter and ran to a nearby laundry where officers shot and killed him. Friends and family were surprised.
2014-08-10	Tyrone "Ty" Bandy (45)	White	Burien, Washington	Police responded to domestic violence call, got girlfriend out of the house and negotiated while SWAT teams lined up. After midnight the man started shooting with shotgun and handgun. Police returned fire, killing him.
2014-08-11	Dillon Taylor (20)	White	Utah (South Salt Lake)	Police arrived at a parking lot of a convenience store, in response to an anonymous caller reporting that there were several men who appeared to be gang members looking for trouble, in which one of them flashed a gun. In a video released to the public, Officer Bron Cruz's body camera shows him approaching Dillon Taylor, in front of the store, and repeatedly ordering him to show his hands, which were in his waistband under his shirt. Taylor is alleged to have said "Nah, fool." Cruz fired two shots at Taylor, hitting him in the chest and abdomen. Taylor later died, and did not have a weapon on him during the shooting. Officer Cruz said he perceived a threat when Taylor made a gesture of reaching for a gun in his pockets. In September 2014, the shooting was ruled justified by Salt Lake County District Attorney Sim Gill. Officer Cruz, in a deposition, stated that although he "wasn't about to shoot [Taylor] in the back," he was "100 percent convinced when I saw him turn around it was gonna be a gunfight."
2014-08-09	Alberto Cornelio Morales (41)	Hispanic	California (Walnut Park)	A gunman shot and injured a Los Angeles County Sheriff's deputy at 4 am., and after a manhunt was found hiding in a dumpster.
2014-08-09	Joseph Penderghest (40)	White	Pennsylvania (Springfield Township)	Officials say troopers approached Penderghest after a car accident. They saw him cutting himself with a knife. Troopers attempted to stop him from harming himself using verbal commands, pepper spray and stun guns, but were unsuccessful. Police say Penderghest advanced toward them with the knife and troopers shot and killed him. Deputies were not identified.
2014-08-09	Michael Brown (18)	Black	Missouri (Ferguson)	Brown was fatally shot by officer Darren Wilson at 2:15 pm. According to officer Wilson and several witnesses, Brown, who was unarmed, assaulted a police officer, and reached for the officer's handgun. The officer then shot Brown. Some witnesses stated that Brown did not assault the officer or go for his gun, but that the patrol car door was opened so close and with such force that it bounced off Brown and closed on the officer. Additionally, some witnesses state Brown had his hands in the air when he was shot dead by the officer and others say he did not. All available evidence and subsequent investigations found Wilson's version of the event and witnesses supporting him credible. Several witnesses, most of them attempting to support Brown, were found to have lied and provided false testimony or simply admitted to investigators they were lying.
2014-08-09	Jose Paulino Jr (38)	Hispanic	Pennsylvania (Tamaqua)	Paulino was "Running around, yelling obscenities, and the employee of the market and a bystander called 911." Paulino was unarmed, but he wouldn't comply with officers, so they stunned with several times with a taser gun, according to State Police.
2014-08-08	Justin Wayne Higgins (23)	White	Arkansas, (Fort Smith)	According to police reports in the media, Higgens was shot and killed by an off-duty deputy after briefly holding a friend at gunpoint
2014-08-08	Name Withheld (31)	Unknown race	Michigan (Detroit)	Officer noticed drugs inside a car during traffic stop. Driver took off with officer hanging on to the car. Officer shot the driver in the chest, fell to the ground and was shaken but not injured.
2014-08-08	Austin David Uncles (26)	White	Colorado (Denver)	Uncles, described in the media as having a "long criminal record in Utah" was shot in the torso after he allegedly pulled a gun on troopers while they were trying to arrest him.
2014-08-07	Jose M. Reyes-Torres (20)	Hispanic	California (Folsom)	The first officer to arrive confronted a single suspect who was armed with a large knife. That officer shot the suspect who is believed to have stabbed a woman and an infant located at the scene.
2014-08-07	Regan Marshall Wagner (23)	White	Texas (Longview)	Wagner was reportedly driving on his way to work when he was shot to death by a police officer during a traffic stop.
2014-08-06	Michael Laray Dozer (26)	Black	California (Bakersfield)	Dozer allegedly poured gasoline on a woman and tried to set her on fire.
2014-08-06	James Pickard Jr. (51)	Hispanic	Hawaii (Pearl City)	A man in a stolen car advanced towards a police car, and officers fired at him.
2014-08-06	Jeremey Lake (19)	Black	Oklahoma (Tulsa)	Jeremy Lake was allegedly shot by his girlfriend's father, Tulsa police officer Shannon Kepler, in front of Lake's home. Kepler, who was off-duty at the time of the shooting, turned himself in to authorities afterwards. Kepler was booked on a charge of first-degree murder, and his wife was booked on a charge of accessory to murder. On August 19, the district's attorney formally charged Kepler with one count of first-degree murder and one count of shooting with intent to kill, for allegedly firing at his daughter. Wife Gina Kepler was arrested as accessory on about August 7. Kepler was sentenced to 25 years in prison for murder.
2014-08-05	Crawford, John (22)	Black	Ohio (Beavercreek)	Crawford was holding an air rifle he picked up from a Walmart shelf when Beavercreek police officer Sean Williams shot him twice. Surveillance video from the Walmart store shows Crawford was turned from the responding Sgt. David Darkow and Officer Sean Williams. Neither officer recognized the cell phone in Crawford's hand as he conversed with the mother of his children. In addition, another shopper, Williams, died of a heart attack while fleeing the shooting. Her death was ruled a homicide. Sgt. David Darkow returned to work August 21. According to a prosecutor, charges of murder, reckless homicide, and negligent homicide were considered by the grand jury. In September 2014, a grand jury determined that no charges will be filed against the two officers.
2014-08-05	Williams, Angela (37)		Ohio (Beavercreek)	
2014-08-05	Rowe, Donyale (37)		Ohio (Cincinnati)	Cincinnati officers Mark Bode and Thomas Weigard pulled over a blue BMW sport utility vehicle after the driver changed lanes without signaling. Police cameras shows passenger Rowe ran from the car. An officer can be heard shouting, "He's (expletive) got a gun! Shoot him!" Officers have not been
2014-08-05	Hudson, Tommy (53)		Virginia (Hudgins)	Recently retired Virginia State Police Master Trooper Tommy Hudson committed suicide with a gunshot to his chest.
2014-08-04	Manuel Flores (28)	Hispanic	New Mexico (Albuquerque)	Man shot after attempting to ram car into Bernalillo County Sheriff's deputy Sam Rodriguez's vehicle.
2014-08-03	Maria Rodriguez (42)	Hispanic	California (Bakersfield)	Rodriguez was shot by Kern County deputies after she pointed a realistic-looking BB handgun at them from on top a pile of stones, at a stones business. The Kern County coroner initially identified the deceased as Sarah Bustamante, age 32. Deputies were not identified.
2014-08-03	Vincent Lee Heims (49)	White	Texas (Houston)	An armed bank robbery suspect was shot by Harris County Sheriff deputies. Officers were not identified.
2014-08-03	Justin Armstrong (28)	Hispanic	Arizona (Pinetop)	Armstrong, an armed shooting suspect, shot in Hon-Dah casino parking lot. Officers were not identified.
2014-08-03	Steve Matthew Doll (40)	White	California (Stockton)	Doll was shot by California Highway Patrol officer Officer Ben Schiesser after chase by car and on foot.
2014-08-03	Yee Vang (20)	Asian	Minnesota (St. Paul)	A carjacking suspect shot at police officers, and officers returned fire, killing the suspect. Police identified the officers involved in the shooting as Laura Finnegan, Dan Gleason, Xiong Yang and Shawn Filiowich.
2014-08-03	Ryan James Swearingen (27)	White	Iowa (Fort Madison)	Ryan Swearingen, who was armed with a knife, was shot by Officer Karl Judd during an incident in Swearingen's home.
2014-08-03	Jacorey Calhoun (23)	Black	California (Oakland)	Alameda County sheriff's deputy Derek Thoms shot JaCorey Calhoun, 23, a possible suspect in a violent home-invasion robbery and pistol whipping early Sunday, hours after he fled from a car stop and hid in the yard of a home.
2014-08-03	Mark L. Lanza (23)	Hispanic	Arizona (Phoenix)	Lanza fired shot at police who arrived at a condominium complex responding to a call of a burglary, and officers returned fire, killing Lanza. Officers were not identified.
2014-08-03	Omar Abrego (37)	Hispanic	California (Los Angeles)	Omar Abrego, 37 and a father of 3, was declared dead Aug. 3 about 12 hours after he was arrested by the two gang-unit sergeants, according to officials. The sergeants took Abrego into custody after they spotted him driving fast in South L.A. and nearly striking a pedestrian in a crosswalk, according to the LAPD. Family members and witnesses told media they saw officers beating Abrego. "They were beating him real bad, and he died of the wounds," said Yair Abrego, the victim’s brother. Names of officers involved were not released.
2014-08-02	Cedric Oscar Ramirez (24)	Hispanic	California (Los Angeles)	Seeking to arrest Ramirez on parole violations, a Los Angeles County sheriff's deputy fought with him in a residential driveway where Ramirez shot at them. The unnamed deputy returned fire, killing bystander Frank Al Mendoza, 54. Ramirez held Mrs. Mendoza hostage for over seven hours before a tactical team shot and killed him.
2014-08-02	Woodson, Tyree (38)		Maryland (Baltimore)	Police say Woodson's fatal gunshot wound was self-inflicted. That would mean that he smuggled his gun into a police station after police brought him there for having several open warrants. "Things don't seem quite right here," said Baltimore Councilman Carl Stokes. "This person could have a gun, a high caliber gun, that could be used against other officers and then he allegedly kills himself." Aftermath: Pending.
2014-08-02	Frank Mendoza (54)	Hispanic	California (Los Angeles)	Mendoza was a bystander to the attempted arrest of Cedric Oscar Ramirez in front of his home when he was shot and killed by an unnamed Los Angeles County sheriff’s deputy. Ramirez took Mrs. Mendoza hostage before being killed by an LAPD tactical team.
2014-08-01	Anthony Calloway (27)	Black	Georgia (Atlanta)	A Fulton County sheriff’s deputy shot and killed Calloway in East Point after the man shot at officers and their dog. The deputy who killed Calloway was not identified in the media.
2014-08-01	Daniel Pierre (42)	Black	New Jersey (Winslow Township)	Described by relatives having "struggled with drug addiction," Pierre was shot and killed by Winslow Township police, who declined to say why they'd been called there. The officers who killed Pierre were not identified in the media.

== See also ==
- Death in custody § United States
- Henry A. Wallace Police Crime Public Database
- List of cases of police brutality
- List of countries with annual rates and counts for killings by law enforcement officers
- List of law enforcement officers killed in the line of duty in the United States
- List of law enforcement officers convicted for an on-duty killing in the United States
- List of shootings by US immigration agents
- List of police reforms related to the George Floyd protests
- List of unarmed African Americans killed by law enforcement officers in the United States
- Lists of killings by law enforcement officers
- Police brutality in the United States
- Police misconduct § United States
- Police riot § United States
- Police use of deadly force in the United States
