= Fletcher Jones (American entrepreneur) =

American businessman (1931-1972)

Fletcher R. Jones
- Born: Fletcher Roseberry Jones; January 22, 1931; Bryan, Texas, U.S.
- Died: November 7, 1972 (aged 41); Santa Ynez Valley, California, U.S.
- Occupations: Businessman; Racehorse breeder
- Partner(s): Sherry Jackson (1967–1972)

Fletcher Roseberry Jones (January 22, 1931 – November 7, 1972) was an American businessman, computer pioneer and thoroughbred racehorse owner.

== Early life and education ==
Born in Bryan, Texas, Jones was the third of three children of an impoverished Depression era family. He graduated from Allen Military Academy in 1949, then studied at university for two years, but did not graduate. His interest in mathematics led to jobs in the fledgling computer departments at aviation companies. Married in 1951, he was transferred to California by his employer, North American Aviation Corp. After time at the company's offices in Columbus, Ohio, Jones and his wife and two small children settled in Los Angeles where he managed a North American Aviation computer center.

== Career ==
In 1959, Fletcher Jones went into business with Roy Nutt, a computer programmer who had been working for United Aircraft Corp. The two founded the software services company Computer Sciences Corporation (CSC), when Jones, who ran the business and marketing end of things, obtained a contract from Honeywell. In 1961, the company moved into the space industry when they obtained a contract to support NASA Jet Propulsion Laboratory's Flight Operations Facility. Within four years of its founding, CSC became the largest software company in the United States. Taking their business public with an IPO listed on the American Stock Exchange, Jones and Nutt became multi-millionaires. By the end of the 1960s, CSC was listed on the New York Stock Exchange and had operations in Canada, the United Kingdom, (Germany), Italy, and in the Netherlands.

== Westerly Stud Farms ==
As a hobby business, Fletcher Jones became involved in the breeding and racing of thoroughbred horses. In 1966, he acquired a 3,200-acre (13 km^{2}) property near Santa Ynez, California that he named Westerly Stud Farms. In addition to a large home, he built a U-shaped main barn, breeding sheds, and other service buildings, as well as a half-mile training track. In order to spend more time on his farm, Jones built an airstrip and piloted his own aircraft to and from the Santa Monica airport near where his office was located.

Westerly Stud Farms' filly Typecast won the 1972 Eclipse Award as the American Champion Older Female Horse.

Selected stakes race wins for Westerly Stud Farms;

- Frank E. Kilroe Mile – Fleet Host (1967)
- San Luis Rey Handicap – Fleet Host (1967)
- San Carlos Handicap – Rising Market (1970)
- San Simeon Handicap – Long Position (1971)
- Las Palmas Handicap – Typecast (1971)
- Del Mar Oaks – House of Cards (1972)
- Santa Monica Handicap – Typecast (1972)
- Hollywood Invitational Turf Handicap – Typecast (1972)
- Man o' War Stakes – Typecast (1972)

Fletcher Jones gave CSC employee Martin J. Wygod his first two horses as a birthday gift. Wygod and his wife Pam have remained owners of racing thoroughbreds ever since.

The Westerly Stud property was sold in an estate dispersal sale in 1973. Since then, its 3,912 acres (15.83 km^{2}) has been subdivided into a number of small parcels, including a section that became the D. Wayne Lukas Westerly training center. The home, with its outbuildings and paddocks, is now part of approximately 200 acres (0.81 km^{2}) and has changed hands several times.

== Art collection ==
Fletcher Jones began purchasing art, particularly works by the French Impressionists. He owned paintings by Edgar Degas, Claude Monet, Pierre Bonnard, Camille Pissarro. As well, he acquired four Picassos, notably his 1901 self-portrait titled Yo, Picasso that was sold by Jones's estate and which, in 1989, would be purchased by the Greek shipping magnate, Stavros Niarchos for US$47.85 million.

== Death and Foundation ==
On November 7, 1972, the forty-one-year-old Jones died when the plane he was piloting home crashed into a hillside. He is buried in the Oak Hill Cemetery in the Santa Ynez Valley.

Jones had divorced his wife in the early 1960s and his estate provided a trust fund for his two sons, Jeffery and Scott, but the bulk of his fortune went to his Fletcher Jones Foundation.

Five months after Jones' death, actress Sherry Jackson, who had lived with him from 1967 until his death, sued his estate for palimony. Jackson's suit asked for more than $1 million ($7.3 million today), with her attorneys stating that Jones had promised to provide her with at least $25,000 a year for the rest of her life.

Jones' art collection was liquidated by his estate, as well as Westerly Stud Farms. The Fletcher Jones Foundation continues to operate and donates primarily to California colleges and universities. Fletcher Jones Professorships have included::

- Michael A. Arbib (Computer Science) at University of Southern California, Emeritus
- Mark Blitz (Political Philosophy) at Claremont McKenna College
- Tom Campbell (Law) at Chapman University School of Law
- Satyan Devadoss (Computer Science) at University of San Diego
- Gerald Fuller (Chemical Engineering) at Stanford University
- Seymour Ginsburg (Computer Science) at University of Southern California
- Ken Gonzales-Day (Art) at Scripps College
- Gene H. Golub (Computer Science, Electrical Engineering) at Stanford University
- John Grotzinger (Geology) at California Institute of Technology
- Menas Kafatos (Computational Physics) at Chapman University
- Donald E. Knuth (Computer Science) at Stanford University, Emeritus
- Rubén Martínez (Literature & Writing) at Loyola Marymount University
- Susan Rankaitis (Studio Art) at Scripps College
- Greg Sarris (Creative Writing and Literature) at Loyola Marymount University
- Kevin Sharpe (History) at the Huntington Library
- Gary Smith (Economics) at Pomona College
- Ivan Sutherland (Computer Science) at California Institute of Technology
- Marcos Villatoro (Creative Writing) at Mount St. Mary's University, Los Angeles
- Jennifer Widom (Computer Science) at Stanford University
- Rotating faculty in the social sciences at Mills College

The University of California, Merced also awards a Fletcher Jones fellowship to graduate students, based on funds from the foundation.
