= Rubén Martínez (writer) =

American journalist

- Born: 1962 (age 63–64); Los Angeles, California
- Writing career
- Notable work: Crossing Over: A Mexican Family on the Migrant Trail

Rubén Martínez (born 1962, Los Angeles) is a journalist, author, and musician. He is the son of Rubén Martínez, a Mexican American who worked as a lithographer, and Vilma Angulo, a Salvadoran psychologist. Among the themes covered in his works are immigrant life and globalization, the cultural and political history of Los Angeles (Martínez's hometown), the civil wars of the 1980s in Central America (his mother is a native of El Salvador), and Mexican politics and culture (he is a second-generation Mexican-American on the father's side of his family). In August 2012 his book Desert America: Boom and Bust in the New Old West was published by Metropolitan Books.

== Professional career ==
From 1988 until 1993, he was a writer and editor at LA Weekly, becoming the first Latino on staff there. Subsequently, he became a contributing essayist to National Public Radio, and a TV host for the Los Angeles-based politics and culture series, Life & Times, for which he won an Emmy Award.

Martínez's books include: Flesh Life: Sex in Mexico (with Joseph Rodriguez, Powerhouse Books, 2006), The New Americans (New Press, 2004), a companion volume to the PBS series of the same name, Crossing Over: A Mexican Family over the Migrant Trail (Metropolitan/Holt, 2001), East Side Stories (with Joseph Rodriguez, Powerhouse Books, 1998), and The Other Side: Notes from the New L.A., Mexico City & Beyond (Vintage, 1993).

Rubén Martínez currently holds the Fletcher Jones Chair in Literature & Writing at Loyola Marymount University in Los Angeles, previously having taught at the University of Houston's Creative Writing Program, the University of California, Santa Barbara, and Claremont McKenna College.

== Books ==
=== Desert America ===
His 2012 book, Desert America: Boom and Bust in the New Old West, reports on the world of "outrageous wealth and devastating poverty, sublime beauty and ecological ruin" that he found when he lived in northern New Mexico, Joshua Tree, California and Marfa, Texas. The Los Angeles Times reviewer, Hector Tobar, wrote, "Martínez treats all the people he writes about, and the places where they live, with the kind of profound respect all too rare among the legions of Western writers who have preceded him. The result is an emotional and intellectually astute portrait of communities long neglected and misunderstood by American literature."

Martínez, says of Velarde, New Mexico, "I might add that I live in one of the poorest villages in one of the poorest counties in one of the poorest states and that the region’s heroin addiction is higher than anywhere else in the country, rural or urban.”

=== Crossing Over ===
Martínez's other major work, Crossing Over: A Mexican Family on the Migrant Trail appeared in 2001. Martínez followed a Mexican migrant clan, the Chavez family, from the small Michoacán town of Cherán, Mexico, into and across the United States. Three of the Chavez's were killed in an accident resulting from a Border Patrol chase while they attempted to cross the border. Martínez also traced the migrations of other families from Cheran, including the Tapias, Enriquezes, and Guzmans. Martínez followed these families as their journeys took them to California, Wisconsin, Missouri and Arkansas in search of the better life. But Martínez found out that this is not what the immigrants necessarily find.

=== The New Americans ===
Rubén Martínez's book The New Americans was written in 2004. Martínez wrote the book in the wake of September 11, 2001, when America's response to immigration changed immensely. Throughout the book he makes references to Ellis Island, the Statue of Liberty, and "The New Colossus", the poem on the Statue of Liberty. Martínez wrote The New Americans to show not only how America's view of immigration has changed, but also how immigration is changing America.

The book follows the story of seven families as they immigrate to the United States. One family is from Palestine. The daughter of this family is marrying a second generation immigrant from Palestine that lives in Chicago. Another family is in exile from Nigeria, and has been granted permission by the United States to move to Chicago. Two other immigrants are from the Dominican Republic, and have come to the United States to play professional baseball. Another family is from Mexico, immigrating to California in order to make money. The last family immigrated from India to California, to make more money than they would be able to make in India.

The New Americans also brings to light many of the difficulties the immigrants face in the process of leaving their homeland and arriving in America. The book shows that the immigrants face problems such as racism, difficulty finding a job, difficulty acculturating, and the overwhelming sadness of leaving the land that they have always known. The New Americans is based on a PBS documentary series also named The New Americans. The book received many positive reviews.

== Articles ==
Rubén Martínez has been featured in many literary magazines for his work. His articles have shown up in various magazines, and his interviews have also been widely published. Below are a few of his articles selected for easy online viewing.

- In his interview with Robert Birnbaum, Rubén Martínez tells of how he was nominated to work at Harvard in the field of urban studies. Birnbaum talks a bit about Martínez's contract with PBS for his book The New Americans, and quickly moves on to his newest book Crossing Over. After the book was completed, Martínez says he was shocked to find that the Mexicans he encountered in Norwalk are largely gone.
- The Minutemen Project is a project in which volunteers show up on the border to help deal with Mexicans migrating into the United States. Martínez comments on the project in an interview with Julia Goldberg.
- "The Migrant Story" is an article written by Rubén Martínez, in which he encourages the reader to envision an immigrant briefing the United States Congress on our current immigration policy. This article requires a free and easy membership to be read in its entirety.
- "The Undocumented Virgen" is another article written by Martínez. He spent December 12, the birthday of la Virgen de Guadalupe, at Our Lady Queen of Angels in downtown LA with many Mexican immigrants. He joins the celebration of la Virgen de Guadalupe's birthday, and illustrates just how important she is to Mexicans, even when they are many miles away from home.
- Another immigration interview with Rubén Martínez. This interview examines why exactly Rubén is so interested in writing about immigration, and why it is such a big deal in the United States.
- Benjamin Adair interviewed Rubén Martínez about his newest book, Crossing Over, on the radio. This webpage has a link to the actual radio interview, but also provides a textual overview of the important points throughout the conversation. It also contains some interesting photos of the accident scene from Crossing Over.
- In another free membership required article, Rubén Martínez describes immigration from the standpoint of someone whose father and grandfather were immigrants. He describes what life is like being of Mexican and Salvadoran heritage while living in the United States. He also talks of how the process of crossing the border affects the immigrants' sense of identity.

== Awards ==
Rubén Martínez has received multiple awards for his work. The awards he has received are the following: The Lannan Foundation fellowship, the Loeb Fellowship from Harvard University's Graduate School of Design, the "Freedom of Information Award" from the ACLU, the "Greater Press Club of Los Angeles Award of Excellence", the Luis Leal award from UC Santa Barbara, and an Emmy Award. The Lannan Foundation fellowship is given to a person whose "work inspires communities domestic and international that are struggling to uphold and defend their right to cultural freedom and diversity", (Lannan Foundation). Martínez won this award in 2002, for his nonfiction work, Crossing Over. In 2005, Martínez was awarded an honorary Doctor of Humane Letters (L.H.D.) degree from Whittier College.

== Other written works ==
- The Other Side: Notes From the New LA, Mexico City, and Beyond (1993), Vintage Books USA, New York
- "Technicolor" in Half + Half: Writers on Growing Up Biracial + Bicultural (1998) Edited by Claudine Chiawei O'Hearn, Pantheon Books, New York
- Eastside Stories (with Joseph Rodriguez) (1998), Powerhouse Books, New York
- Crossing Over: A Mexican Family on the Migrant Trail (2001), Henry Holt and Company, New York
- The New Americans (2004), New Press, New York
- Flesh Life: Sex in Mexico City (with Joseph Rodriguez) (2006), Powerhouse Books, New York
- Desert America: Boom and Bust in the New Old West (2012)
