= Manliness (book) =

2006 book by Harvey Mansfield

- Author: Harvey C. Mansfield
- Language: English
- Subject: Masculinity
- Publisher: Yale University Press
- Publication date: 2006
- Publication place: United States
- Media type: Print (hardback)
- Pages: 288
- ISBN: 0-300-10664-5
- OCLC: 61309282
- Dewey Decimal: 305.31 22
- LC Class: HQ1090 .M365 2006

Manliness is a book by Harvey C. Mansfield first published by Yale University Press in 2006. Mansfield is a professor of government at Harvard University. In this book, he defines manliness as "confidence in a situation of risk" and suggests this quality is currently undervalued in Western society.

He suggests the quality is more common in men than in women, but does not strictly exclude women, for example he names Margaret Thatcher. He also suggests the quality is "good and bad", not all good, but not all bad. His main point is that gender neutral ideology denies both the reality of sex-specific qualities, and the valuable components of these, to the detriment of society.

Mansfield attributes the rise of gender neutral ideology firstly to Friedrich Nietzsche, Karl Marx and Jean-Paul Sartre, and then to feminists who repackaged the ideas as part of a political program. He names Simone de Beauvoir, Betty Friedan and Germaine Greer.

== Overview ==
Today the very word manliness seems quaint and obsolete. We are in the process of making the English language gender-neutral, and manliness, the quality of one gender, or rather, of one sex, seems to describe the essence of the enemy we are attacking, the evil we are eradicating. -Harvey Mansfield, Manliness

Mansfield evaluates the concept of manliness as it has been expressed over the course of Western civilization, and considers its virtues. As Mansfield stated to NPR's Tom Ashbrook, "Some people say manliness doesn't exist. Others say it does exist and it's bad. I say it exists and it's good ... and bad."

Drawing on classical philosophy, literature, and science, Mansfield argues that manliness is a virtue primarily associated with the male sex which is preferable to widespread institutional gender-neutral ideology.

Beginning with modern scientific discoveries, Mansfield appropriates them for insights on how these innate biological realities might exert an influence on gender identity and gender role preferences. Mansfield then proceeds to literature, drawing on Homer, Rudyard Kipling, and Hemingway to support his thesis that manliness has been a perpetual component of the male psyche and behavior.

Mansfield then offers an analysis of the historical forces in the nineteenth and early twentieth centuries, singling out Simone de Beauvoir, Betty Friedan, and Germaine Greer as the key writers to have influenced, what he considers to be, the dismantling of manliness. These writers shared two common hypotheses they derived from earlier writers: from Marx they drew the theory of economic exploitation, and from Nietzsche their flirtations with nihilism. Finally, Mansfield turns to Aristotle as the archetypal expounder of manliness to identify the quality of "philosophical courage," which Mansfield concludes is the ideal understanding of manliness.

== See also ==
- Masculinity
- Masculism

== Reviews ==
=== Scholarly reviews ===
- Cooper, Barry F. The Review of Politics 69 (2007): 471–474.
- Henry, Douglas V. The Review of Politics 69 (2007): 469–471.
- Lasch, LC. Perspectives on Political Science 35 (2006): 103–118.
- Newart, Tatia. Women's Studies 35 (2006): 693–696.
- Norton, Anne. Perspectives on Politics 4 (2006): 759–761.
- Ramachandran, Gowri. Yale Journal of Law & Feminism 19 (2007): 201–220.
- Jensen, Robert. Sexuality Research & Social Policy 3 (2006): 98–100.

=== Press ===
- Hoff Sommers, Christina. 'Being a Man'. The Weekly Standard 4 April 2006.
- Kirn, Walter. 'Who's the Man?' The New York Times 19 March 2006.
- Nussbaum, Martha. 'Man Overboard'. The New Republic 22 June 2006.
- Piereson, James (May 2006). "Is manliness obsolete?". The New Criterion. Vol. 24, no. 9. New York City: The Foundation for Cultural Review. ISSN 0734-0222.
- Shea, Christopher. 'The manly man's man'. The Boston Globe 12 May 2006.
- Solomon, Deborah. 'Questions for Harvey Mansfield: Of manliness and men'. The New York Times 12 March 2006.
