= Mark Blitz =

American political philosopher

Mark Blitz (born March 15, 1946) is an American political philosopher and Fletcher Jones Professor of Political Philosophy at Claremont McKenna College. He earned degrees at Harvard University (BA, PhD).

== Books ==
- Plato's political philosophy, Baltimore : Johns Hopkins University Press, 2010
- Conserving liberty, Stanford, Calif. : Hoover Institution Press, Stanford University, 2011
- Duty bound : responsibility and American public life, Lanham (Md.) : Rowman and Littlefield publ., 2005
- Heidegger's Being and time and the possibility of political philosophy, Ithaca : Cornell university press, 1981
- Reason and Politics: The Nature of Political Phenomena, 2021
- Aristotle's Political Philosophy: An Inquiry into the "Nicomachean Ethics," "Politics," and "Rhetoric", University of Notre Dame Pess, 2026
