= Killing of Ezell Ford =

2014 homicide by Los Angeles Police Department

- Location of Los Angeles within Los Angeles County and California
- Date: August 11, 2014
- Location: Florence, Los Angeles, California, U.S.
- Participants: Sharlton Wampler and Antonio Villegas (officers); Ezell Ford (death)
- Deaths: Ezell Ford
- Litigation: Ford's family file $75 million lawsuit against city of Los Angeles

Ezell Ford was a 25-year-old African-American man who was shot and killed by Los Angeles Police Department (LAPD) officers in Florence, Los Angeles, California on August 11, 2014. The officers and eyewitnesses offered competing accounts of the events surrounding the shooting. An investigation by the LAPD's watchdog unit, Los Angeles Board of Police Commissioners, concluded in June 2015 that one officer had been justified in the shooting while the other had been unjustified, had acted outside of LAPD policy, and had violated Ford's civil rights by detaining him.

In the weeks and months that followed, Ford's shooting triggered multiple demonstrations and a lawsuit by Ford's family that sought $75 million in damages.

== Backgrounds ==
=== Ezell Ford ===
Ezell Earl Ford (October 14, 1988 – August 11, 2014) was the oldest of seven children. At the time of his birth his parents, Tritobia and Edsell, were 16 and 17 years old respectively. His parents said in August 2014, they had been living in the same neighborhood for 15 years. Ford attended 66th Street Elementary, Marcus Garvey Elementary, Bethune Middle School, and Verbum Dei High School, which he left before completing a full term. As a child, he played basketball, and wanted to play professionally and to study medicine. In his youth, Ford suffered from asthma and difficulty breathing.

In September 2007, Ford was arrested on felony charges of carrying a loaded firearm and possession of marijuana with intent to sell. He argued the marijuana was for personal use, and in January 2008, the charge was reduced to a misdemeanor, for which he paid a small fine. He pleaded guilty to the firearm charge and was sentenced to 90 days in jail. In 2008, Ford was shot in the leg in a gang-related incident. A neighbor said that Ford was an innocent bystander in the shooting, and that his mental illness became more evident from then on. Ford also had a prior conviction for trespassing.

After his deathm his parents said their son had been diagnosed with depression, bipolar disorder and schizophrenia, and that everybody in the neighborhood, as well as police, were aware of this. They recalled that Ford had become more introverted and melancholy around the age of 18, and took medication that made him less active.

Ashanti Harrison, a neighbor, said he had grown up with Ford, who "did not bother nobody. He was kind of slow. The whole neighborhood took care of him." Harrison also described Ford as having "the mental capacity of an 8-year-old", while another neighbor said "He had a mind of a 10-year-old". Another neighbor said while Ford "wasn't all there, he was there enough to follow orders and know to stop when the police tell him to stop." Leroy Hill, who described himself as an eyewitness to the shooting, and Harrison both said Ford was not involved in gangs. A neighbor said the officers who shot Ford had harassed him in the past, including the day before the shooting.

=== Sharlton Wampler and Antonio Villegas ===
The officers involved in the shooting were named on August 28 as Sharlton Wampler and Antonio Villegas, both gang enforcement officers in the LAPD's Newton Division. Wampler had been on the force for twelve years, Villegas for eight. Wampler is Asian American and Villegas is Latino. The two men had been working together in the Newton Division for five months.

Wampler had previously arrested Ford on marijuana possession charges in 2008. He was also one of two officers accused in a 2011 lawsuit of assaulting and pepper spraying members of a South Los Angeles family in 2009. A settlement was reached in the case in 2012 but details were not disclosed in court records.

== Shooting ==
=== LAPD accounts ===
According to LAPD commander Andy Smith, officers Wampler and Villegas saw Ford walking on the sidewalk at 65th Street and left their vehicle. Wampler said he knew Ford but did not recognize him at the time. The two officers confronted Ford as part of an "investigative stop" at around 8:20 p.m. They told investigators that though they carried a Taser in the patrol car, neither took it out, and Villegas instead drew his gun. Villegas said he believed Ford may have been armed because he was in "a gang area". Villegas soon put the gun away and repositioned himself as the "cover" officer while Wampler approached Ford. After the release of Ford's autopsy, LAPD chief Charlie Beck said Ford walked away after Wampler and Villegas left their vehicle to speak to him. An earlier press release said Ford looked towards the officers but kept walking and "made suspicious movements, including attempting to conceal his hands". According to Beck, Wampler and Villegas told detectives Ford concealed his hands as they attempted to stop him. According to Beck's account the officers then followed Ford to a driveway where he crouched between a car and some bushes. Wampler and Villegas said they believed Ford was trying to dispose of drugs that were in his possession, which Wampler felt was sufficient evidence to arrest him. No drugs were found in the vicinity, however. Smith said Ford had been unarmed.

Smith said as they were walking towards him Ford "whirled around and basically attacked the lead officer". Wampler told investigators he had approached Ford from behind and pulled back his shoulder with the intention of handcuffing him. The officers and an LAPD spokesman said that Ford had "tackled" one of the officers and that a struggle ensued after Ford tried to remove the officer's handgun from its holster. Smith said Ford "grabbed the officer around the waist, threw him to the ground and was laying on top of the officer" when he was shot. In Beck's account, Wampler and Villegas told investigators that Ford had been on top of one of the officers and reaching for the officer's gun when they both opened fire. Wampler told investigators he had been tackled by Ford and had landed on top of Ford, but Ford rolled over immediately and took the top position. Villegas responded by pushing his knee into Ford's back and attempting to handcuff him. Wampler said he then felt Ford grasping at his holstered pistol. Villegas said he feared for his life and that of his partner and shot Ford in the arm, then at Wampler's urging fired a second round into Ford's side. Wampler said Ford continued to resist, causing him to retrieve his backup gun and used it to reach around Ford and shoot him in the back.

After the shooting, Wampler handcuffed Ford. Wampler told investigators a crowd appeared, including one man who appeared angry but left after Wampler pointed his gun at him. Thirteen seconds elapsed from the time that Wampler and Villegas left their vehicle to the first shot. LAPD lieutenant Ellis Imaizumi said the officers sustained minor abrasions that did not require hospitalization. An LAPD news release said neither had been injured.

=== Other accounts ===
Two witnesses disputed the officers' claim that Ford had concealed his hands, and said that he had raised his hands as the officers left their vehicle. They also said that Ford did not tackle an officer, and was instead tackled to the ground by one of the officers. Tritobia Ford said her son was lying on the ground and complying with officers' orders when he was shot. Other family members supported her account, including a man who identified himself as Ford's cousin and said:

They laid him out and for whatever reason, they shot him in the back, knowing mentally, he has complications. Every officer in this area, from the Newton Division, knows that — that this child has mental problems. The excessive force ... there was no purpose for it. The multiple shootings in the back while he's laying down? No. Then when the mom comes, they don't try to console her ... they pull the billy clubs out.

Ashanti Harrison, who said he saw the shooting from a second-story window, said Ford had put his hands in the air when he was tackled to the ground and shot three times. Harrison said that while on the ground, Ford "was struggling like he didn't want anyone on top of him, didn't want anyone holding him down". Two women who were in the home adjacent to the driveway said Ford had not been on top of one of the officers, and had instead been face-down with the officer on top of him. Dorene Henderson, a friend of the Ford family, said she heard someone yell "Get down, get down." She said she heard a pop and neighbors telling officers "He's got mental problems." Leroy Hill said: "I was sitting across the street when it happened ... The cops jumped out of the car and rushed him over here into this corner. They had him in the corner and were beating him, busted him up, for what reason I don't know he didn't do nothing." Hill said he heard an officer say "Shoot him", followed by three gunshots, while Ford was on the ground. Ina Smalls, who lives across the street from Ford, said she ran outside after hearing gunshots and saw Ford "on the ground, shot dead, handcuffed on his stomach". Smalls said she did not believe that Ford had tried to take the officer's gun. Fred Sayre, Ford's parents' attorney, said none of the witnesses he had spoken to could decisively say whether Ford grabbed for the officer's gun.

=== Events immediately following the shooting ===
Ford was taken to California Hospital Medical Center, where he underwent surgery and was pronounced dead at 10:10 p.m. Tritobia Ford said police had refused to inform her where her son was hospitalized. Police initially offered little information about the shooting and did not initially release Ford's name or specify why they stopped him. Imaizumi said police had declined to release information due to a "gathering" at the scene.

== Investigations ==
=== Initial response ===
Both officers were placed on paid leave. In the aftermath of the shooting, and in response to threats on social media, the LAPD directed all officers to travel in pairs. Hutchinson and other civil rights leaders met with LAPD officials on August 14. Hutchinson said he was reassured by the meeting and believed the LAPD was taking the concerns seriously, and that it would fast-track the investigation while ensuring transparency. The activists who attended the meeting stressed that they did not want to see in Los Angeles rioting similar to that seen in Ferguson or in L.A. in 1992.

LAPD officials named Wampler and Villegas as the shooters on August 28. Wampler's name had been leaked the previous day by blogger Jasmyne Cannick. In a statement, the department commented "it was necessary to investigate evidence ... regarding potential threats to the safety of the officers and ensure that measures were taken to mitigate those threats." Both officers remained on paid administrative leave. In December 2014, a department spokesman said both officers had been reassigned to administrative duties.

In August 2014, Paysinger said the LAPD would investigate the shooting with oversight by the Los Angeles Board of Police Commissioners, its Office of Inspector General, and the office of the Los Angeles District Attorney. On August 18, Los Angeles mayor Eric Garcetti said he would ensure a "full and fair investigation" took place.

=== Autopsy ===
On August 18, the LAPD placed a "security hold" on the release of the report of Ford's autopsy. Smith said the hold was due to the risk that the autopsy's findings would affect witnesses' testimonies, but Hutchinson said it would fuel "suspicions about the LAPD's version of the Ford killing".

In October 2014, the South Central Neighborhood Council passed a resolution calling on Los Angeles City Council member Curren Price to direct the LAPD to release Ford's autopsy report. A spokesman said the LAPD was reluctant to release information that could adversely affect ongoing investigations, and that the department had seen little success in finding witnesses. On November 13, Garcetti said the report would be made public by the end of 2014.

The autopsy was released on December 29. It showed that Ford was shot three times: in the back, side and right arm. The gunshot wound in his back bore a "muzzle imprint" suggesting the shot was fired at very close range. It also noted multiple abrasions to Ford's hand and arm. Experts consulted by the Los Angeles Times said none of the autopsy's findings were unexpected or contradicted the officers' accounts.

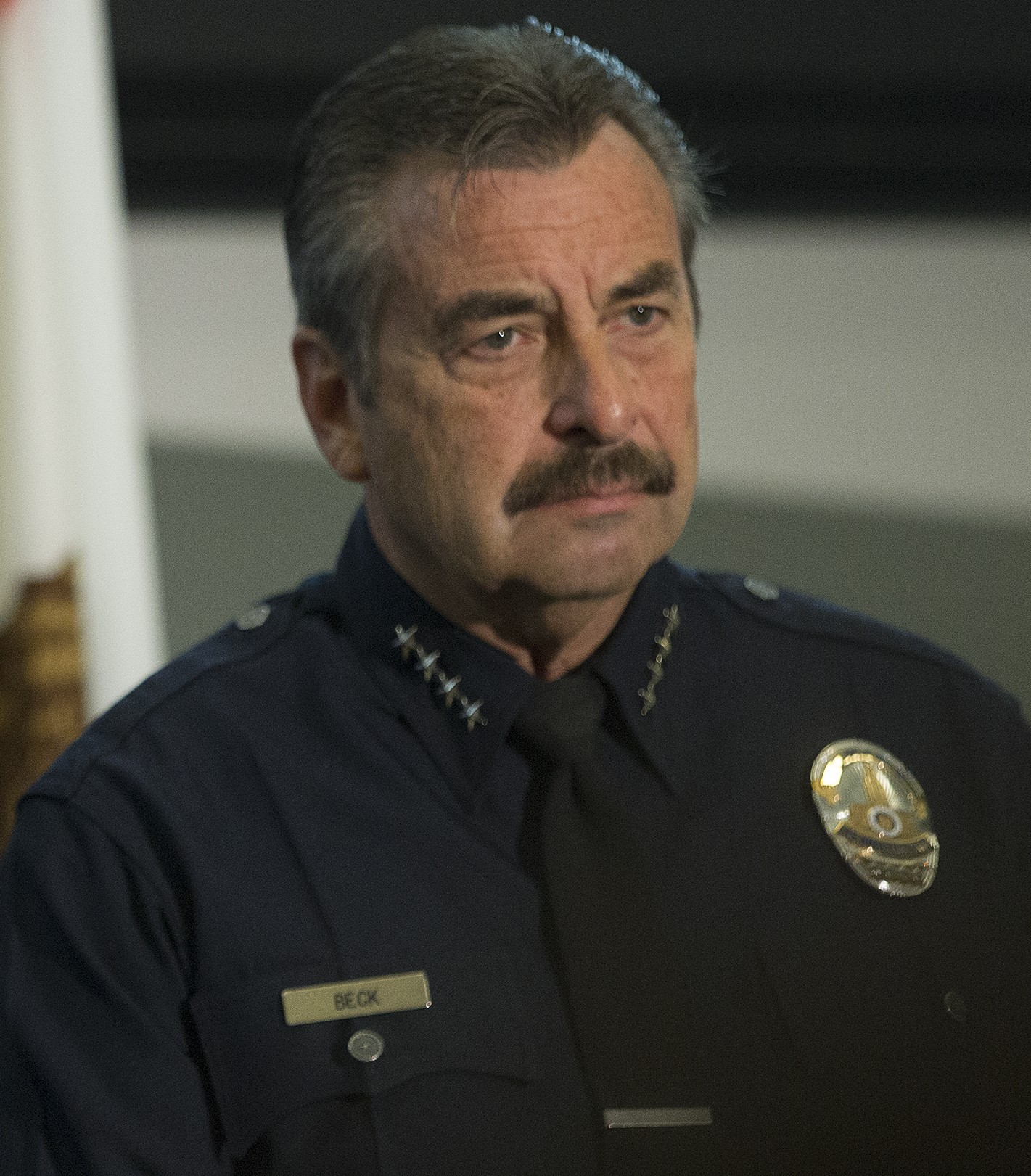
LAPD chief Charlie Beck in January 2014

=== Charlie Beck report ===
LAPD chief Charlie Beck concluded in a report that Wampler and Villegas had been justified in their actions. His investigation found that Wampler had grounds to reasonably suspect that Ford had been in possession of drugs.

=== Alex Bustamante report ===
Steve Soboroff, the president of the Board of Police Commissioners, said in August 2014 that he had asked the office of the Inspector General to prioritize its investigation of Ford's case. On September 2 Inspector General Alex Bustamante issued a statement urging witnesses to come forward. Bustamante said despite the conflicting accounts of the shooting, he had only succeeded in contacting one witness. In November 2014 Beck, District Attorney Jackie Lacey and Price called on witnesses to come forward. On December 4 Beck said no new witnesses had been identified. Beck and Bustamante reiterated in December 2014 and January 2015 that the department had encountered difficulties in finding witnesses, and that witnesses whose names were provided by the Ford family's attorney had been uncooperative.

Bustamante's report found that Wampler and Villegas's actions had been justified, but found that Wampler did not have grounds to reasonably suspect that Ford had been in possession of drugs. The report criticized Wampler's decision to initiate physical contact with Ford as a "substantial deviation from tactical training" that put him at risk of assault. Bustamante explained that, though Ford was looking back at Wampler and Villegas while taking his hands in and out of his pockets, this alone was not enough "to cross the threshold of reasonable suspicion".

=== Los Angeles Board of Police Commissioners report ===
On June 5, 2015, the Los Angeles Times reported that "according to sources with knowledge of the investigation", the Board of Police Commissioners had determined that both Wampler and Villegas were justified in the shooting. Soboroff responded the same day that the Board had received several recommendations but had yet to make a decision.

On June 9, 2015, the Board's ruling stated that Villegas was justified in the shooting, but Wampler violated Ford's civil rights by detaining him. The commission rejected Beck's conclusion that Wampler had adhered to LAPD policy. The investigation found that Villegas did not have a good reason to initially draw his gun, and that Wampler did not have grounds to reasonably suspect that Ford had been in possession of drugs. Nine different determinations were issued: Wampler was found in violation of policy in four areas (tactics, drawing of weapon, use of non-lethal force, use of deadly force), while Villegas was within policy in three areas (tactics, use of non-lethal force, and use of deadly force) and one part of another area (drawing of weapon on the second occasion) but in violation of policy in another part of the same area (drawing of weapon on the first occasion). The Board's decision to consider the "totality of the circumstances, and not just the moment in which force was used" marked a departure from its previous approach to police shootings, which involved assessing only whether officers faced a deadly threat at the moment they opened fire. More than 100 people attended the Board's public meeting on June 9.

The Board's decision is not legally binding. Its findings will be sent to the LAPD's internal affairs group, and after a few months, will be forwarded to Beck, who will determine if he will discipline the officers involved. Any possible criminal charges will be determined by Lacey.

Speaking after the Board's ruling, Beck downplayed the disagreement between its report and his own, and said the result was the outcome of a system of checks and balances. Beck also released a video message in which he told LAPD officers: "You have my support. You have the support of the mayor. You have the support of the vast majority of the people of Los Angeles." Soboroff questioned Beck's failure to also mention the Board of Police Commissioners, which he described as "hurtful but ... untrue". Beck said it was not his intention to suggest that the Board did not support officers.

Craig Lally, the president of the Los Angeles Police Protective League (LAPPL), criticized the ruling, and claimed the Board had dealt with the officers severely to prevent civil unrest. Lally and other LAPPL officials addressed commissioners at the Board's first public meeting following the decision, where he criticized Commissioner Paula Madison for comments she made on KNBC, in which she compared changing use of force laws to changing laws that once condoned slavery or barred women from voting. Lally described Madison's remarks as "disturbing and insulting". Lally also described Ford as a "known gang member".

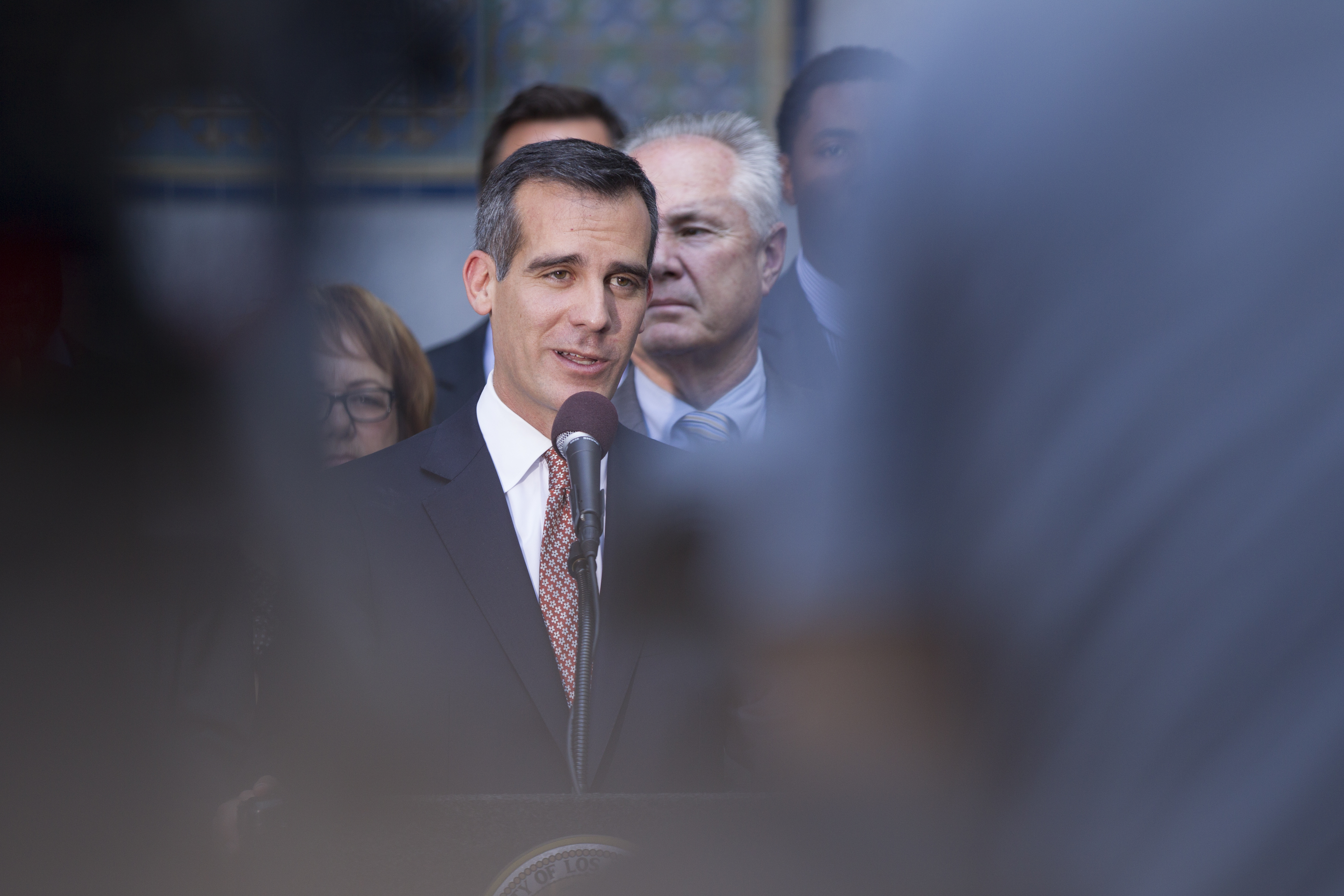
Los Angeles mayor Eric Garcetti in April 2014

Garcetti commented on the Board of Police Commissioner's report on June 13, 2015. He said "I think it's so important for law enforcement officers to know that they are supported," and emphasized the need "to strengthen the bonds between community and between police." Garcetti also met with Tribotia Ford, and told reporters "It was a really beautiful meeting between the two of us, I think". Ford said she was grateful to the mayor but the meeting had come "10 months late."

=== Disciplinary process and long-term response ===
In June 2015, Beck criticized confidentiality laws, which he argued prevented him from making public the disciplinary measures to be placed on Wampler and Villegas, and called for "greater leeway for the police department to make not only the decisions known, but the rationale behind the decision". He said that these confidentiality requirements prevented him from discussing what measures would be taken against Wampler, or what form they could take.

In July 2015, officials told KPCC that the LAPD would re-train all its officers in de-escalating confrontations with suspects and in approaching people with mental illnesses, in part in response to the shootings of Ford and Michael Brown.

== Responses ==
=== Comparisons to Michael Brown ===
Local civil rights leaders and some on social media drew comparisons between Ford and the shooting of Michael Brown in Ferguson, Missouri, two days previously. Earl Ofari Hutchinson, the president of the Los Angeles Urban Policy Roundtable, released a statement soon after the shooting commenting, "The killing of Ezell Ford — coming on the heels of the Michael Brown killing in Ferguson, Missouri — again raises the issue and problem of tense police-community relations." Hutchinson also said: "If in fact Ferguson hadn't happened, if in fact we hadn't seen what we've seen the last two days there ... I don't know there would be the same sense of urgency. I think coming on the heels of that, it does give it a sense of urgency."

=== Protests and community response ===
==== August 2014 ====
On the morning of August 13 a group of men gathered at a makeshift memorial featuring candles and sign reading "police brutality must stop".

On August 14, a rally and march was attended by around 100 protesters who marched from Leimert Plaza Park along Crenshaw Boulevard to the LAPD's 77th division statement. Protesters marched with their hands raised shouted "hands up, don't shoot", and chanted Ford's name. The protest took place simultaneously with demonstrations in 90 other US cities as part of a National Moment of Silence for Michael Brown. Lavell Ford, Ezell Ford's brother, spoke, saying: "They killing us all, they killing us all. Blacks, Latinos, everybody, they just killing us. And we gotta take a stand. It happens everyday around in this neighborhood, everyday. That could've been me laying out there." After the protest many demonstrators went to the scene of the shooting. Another protest took place the following day, and was attended by around 36 people.

On August 15, Paysinger favorably compared the Los Angeles' community's reaction to Ford's death to the reaction to Brown's death in Missouri, and attributed the absence of violence to "the confidence the public has in the police department to conduct an immediate, a thorough, a thoughtful investigation". Paysinger added that the LAPD does "a much better job reaching out to the community" than it had done previously. Soboroff described the comparison as "apples to oranges", due to the LAPD's emphasis on community policing. Price said "Los Angeles is not Ferguson. Much work has gone into changing the culture of our police department. Our progress is evidenced this evening by the presence of our chief of police and his command staff."

On August 15 a video entitled "Fuck the Police" was posted online accompanying a song by Ceebo the Rapper. The song's lyrics state "When they killed Ez' [Ford], they should have killed me," and described police as "the enemy" and "KKK in the flesh." On August 21 the Los Angeles Police Protective League (LAPPL) called for officers to be on heightened alert in response to the video. Ceebo the Rapper, a cousin of Ford, said "There was never any intent [in the song] to threaten any police or nothing. But I guess that's how they want to take it".

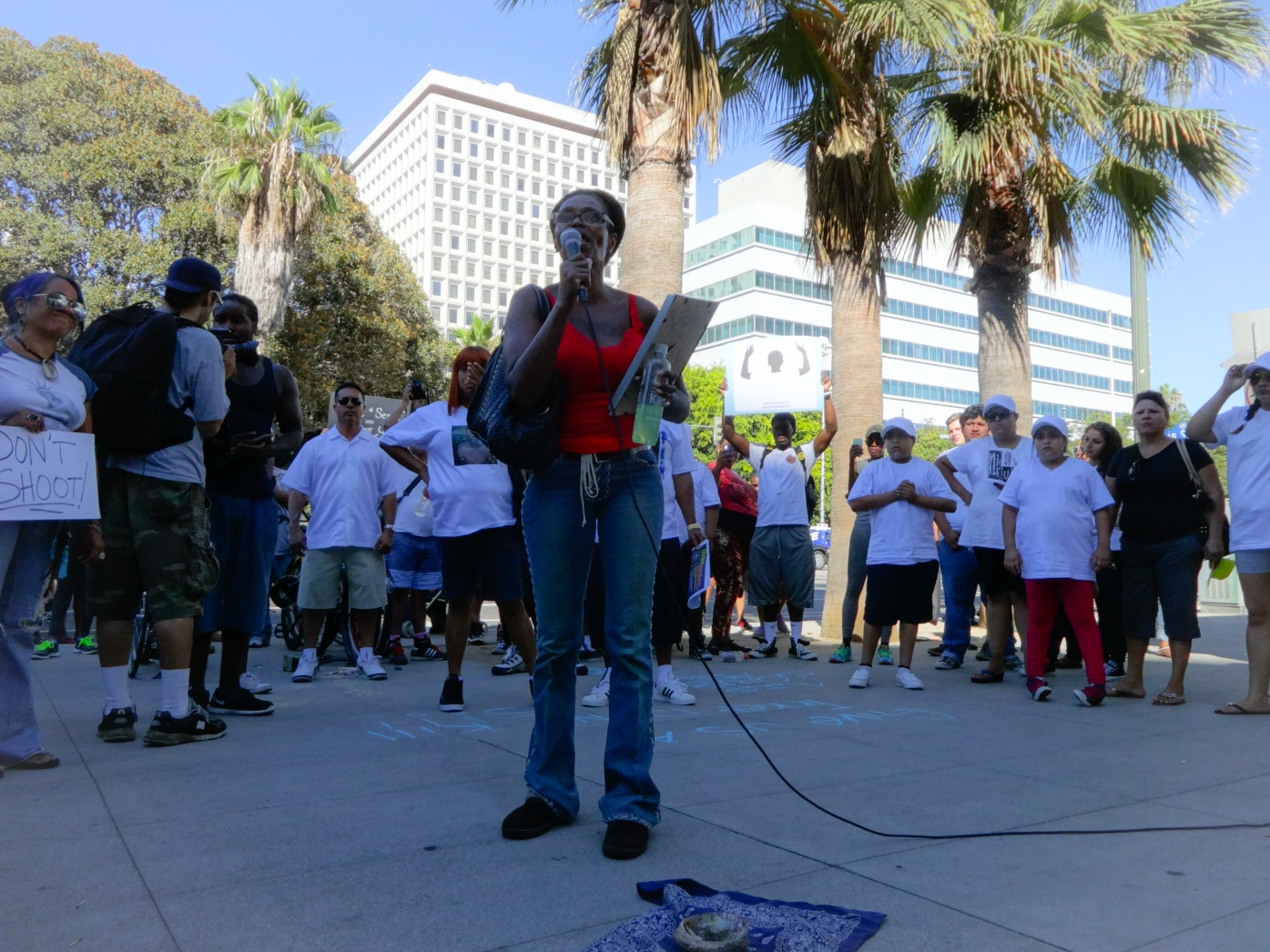
A protester speaks at the August 17 demonstration

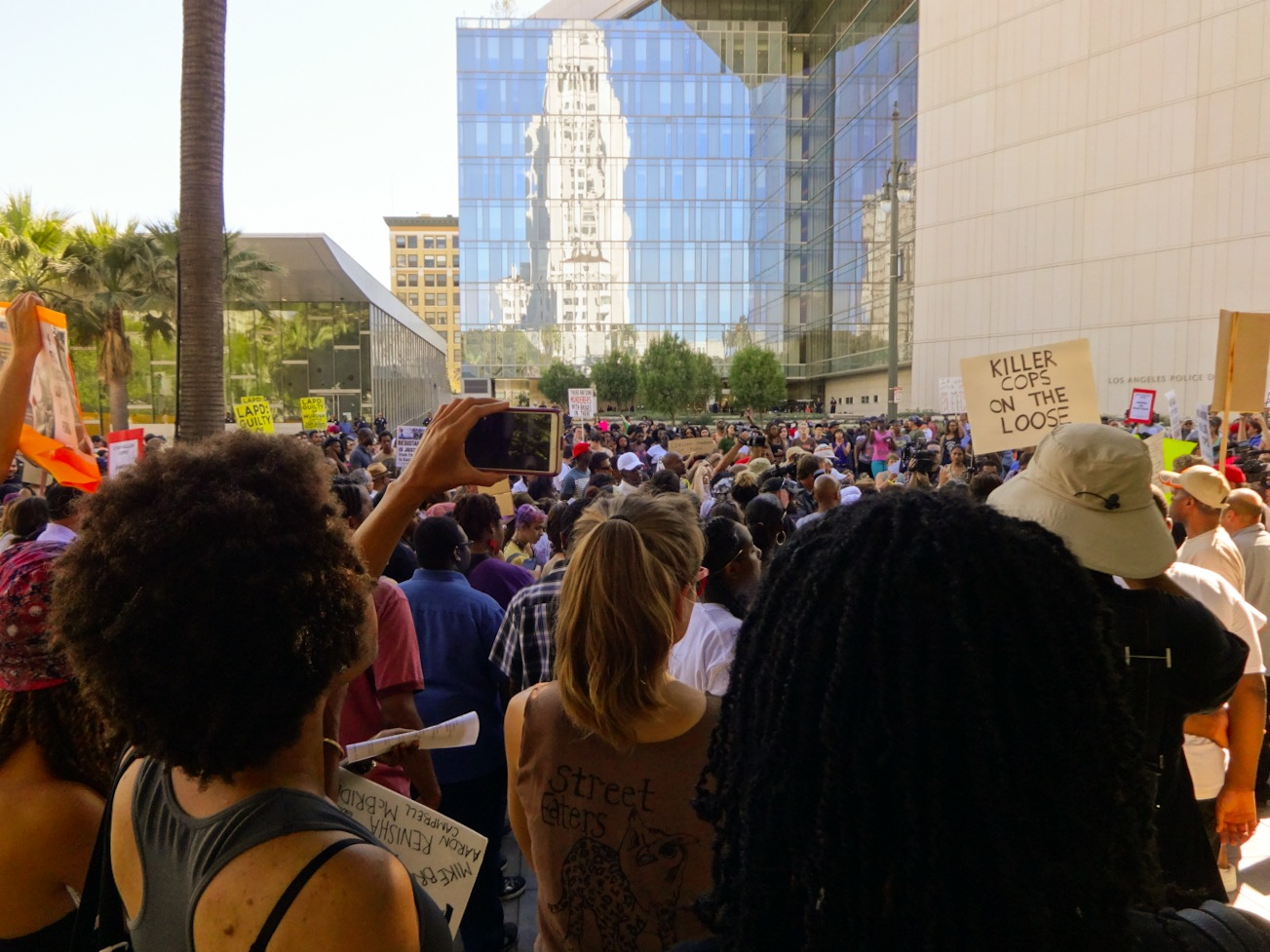
Protesters outside LAPD headquarters on August 17

Another protest occurred on August 17, in response to Ford's death as well as that of Brown. Several hundred protesters marched to LAPD headquarters, where several speeches were made, and then to Union Station, La Placita, through Little Tokyo and Chinatown to City Hall. Protesters carried signs carrying the names of Ford and Brown; others wore Guy Fawkes masks. The protesters again chanted "Hands up, don't shoot", and called for charges to be brought against the officers involved in Ford's death, and for the names of the officers to be released. Speakers also demanded increased civilian oversight of the police and mandatory body cameras. Interactions between police and protesters were minimal and no violence was reported.

On August 19, Beck answered questions before an audience of around 300 community members at Paradise Baptist Church in South Los Angeles, including members of Ford's family. Beck told the audience there remained "more questions than answers" in the Ford investigation, and said "We wonder the same things: Was it necessary? Was it justified? Could there have been another way? I want exactly what you want ... and that is the truth." Beck declined to name the officers or share information on why they had stopped Ford, explaining "I will not give you half a story ... We have to find out all the facts"; and promised the names would be released when the department believed they were no longer in danger of retaliation. Soboroff, Bustamante, Deputy District Attorney James Garrison, and Price also attended. Another protest also took place on the same day. After attending the meeting Paysinger said "You think you're in a good place, but then you find yourself at that meeting ... It was patently clear to me that we need to get busy." Paysinger also commented that two decades previously such a meeting would not have taken place and said he "found great satisfaction, at least in some way, that people came. They had an ability to voice their dissatisfaction with the LAPD because I think somewhere deep down, they do believe that something is going to happen." Around 100 people took part in another protest on August 21.

Ford's funeral was held on August 30 at the First African Methodist Episcopal Church of Los Angeles. County supervisor Mark Ridley-Thomas, Price, U.S. Representative Maxine Waters and former U.S. Representative Diane Watson spoke at the service. Speakers linked Ford's death to other encounters between officers and unarmed African-American men, including the shooting of Michael Brown.

==== Later events ====
On December 29, 2014, following the release of Ford's autopsy, demonstrators gathered outside LAPD headquarters and at Leimert Park. That evening protesters briefly blocked traffic on the 110 Freeway.

In December 2014 a group of activists including Hutchinson announced the Ezell Ford Police Conflict Reduction Plan, calling for mandatory body cameras, a review of deadly force policies, retraining on mental health issues, a conflict mediation task force, and for referring all officer-involved shootings to criminal prosecutors. Another demonstration took place on January 3, 2015, organised by the Coalition for Community Control Over the Police, with around 50 participants.

In late December 2014 and early January 2015 protesters camped outside LAPD headquarters. On January 5 they were forced to leave, with two arrests made after participants tried to pass barricades to deliver their demands to Beck. The following day demonstrators attended the weekly meeting of the Los Angeles Board of Commissioners, demanding greater transparency and civilian control over the LAPD. Later in January protesters continued to gather daily outside LAPD headquarters, demanding that Wampler and Villegas be terminated and that Lacey file charges against the officers. An activist interviewed by ColorLines said LAPD officers had used "intimidation tactics" against the encampment. On January 9 leaders met with Beck, who did not accept the demand that the officers be fired but agreed to treat the protesters with greater respect. Following the meeting police removed the metal barricade used to keep the protesters away from the building.

Prior to the Board of Commissioners' announcement of its findings in June 2015 a protest camp was established outside Garcetti's home. Later in June a small group of protesters gathered in response to reports that Beck and Bustamante would find that Wampler and Villegas were justified in shooting Ford. After the ruling community activists called on Lacey to file criminal charges against Wampler. Tritobia Ford applauded the outcome and joined in calling for Lacey to file charges. She also said she was "kind of surprised" by the decision. In July 2015 Garcetti announced he would meet with Black Lives Matter activists who called for the dismissal of Beck, Wampler and Villegas.

Ford's family held a memorial service for Ford at Inglewood Park Cemetery on August 8, 2015. Protesters disrupted a meeting of the Board of Police Commissioners on August 11, the first anniversary of Ford's death. Protesters shouted at a woman who spoke in support of police officers, and held photographs of Ford. An LAPD lieutenant declared an unlawful assembly, and demonstrators delivered written demands that Beck, Wampler and Villegas attend a "people's tribunal". No arrests were made and the demonstration continued outside LAPD headquarters.

== Legal proceedings ==
In September 2014, Ford's family members filed a federal wrongful-death lawsuit against the LAPD. They voluntarily dismissed this suit in June 2016.

In March 2015, Ford's parents filed a second wrongful-death lawsuit in state court, alleging that Wampler and Villegas intentionally or negligently shot Ford and that Wampler and Villegas violated Ford's constitutional rights. The suit also alleged that the LAPD had a longstanding practice of violating civil rights, and that Wampler and Villegas were motivated by Ford's race and their "prejudice, disdain and contempt for African Americans or persons of black skin tone." The City of Los Angeles settled this lawsuit in October 2016 for $1.5 million.

In January 2017 Los Angeles County prosecutors said Wampler and Villegas would not face criminal charges in connection with the shooting.

== See also ==
- List of unarmed African Americans killed by law enforcement officers in the United States
- Lists of killings by law enforcement officers in the United States
- List of killings by law enforcement officers in the United States, August 2014
