= Frederick Rudolph =

American historian

Frederick Rudolph (1920 – June 3, 2013) was an American historian of U.S. higher education. He was the Mark Williams Professor of History at Williams College and authored The American College and University: A History.
