= List of killings by law enforcement officers in the United States, March 2020 =

This is a list of people reported killed by non-military law enforcement officers in the United States in March 2020, whether in the line of duty or not, and regardless of reason or method. The listing documents the occurrence of a death, making no implications regarding wrongdoing or justification on the part of the person killed or officer involved. Killings are arranged by date of the incident that caused death. Different death dates, if known, are noted in the description. The table below lists 118 people.

== March 2020 ==
Date	Name (age) of deceased	Race	State (city)	Description
2020-03-31	Edward Bronstein (38)	White	California (Altadena)	Police arrested Bronstein for a suspected DUI. At the station officers restrained Bronstein as they attempted to get a blood sample, holding him face down on a mat despite him saying he couldn't breathe. Bronstein fell unconscious and died. In 2023 six California Highway Patrol officers, a sergeant, and a nurse were charged with manslaughter in Bronstein's death.
2020-03-31	Enrique Quiroz (41)		Texas (Austin)	Quiroz experienced a medical emergency and died after officers used a stun gun on him.
2020-03-31	Valente Acosta-Bustillos (52)	Hispanic	New Mexico (Albuquerque)	Acosta-Bustillos was shot and killed by police.
2020-03-31	Shane Tilman Kent (29)	White	North Carolina (Asheville)	Kent was shot and killed by police.
2020-03-31	Anthony E. Pacheco (37)	Hispanic	California (Pomona)	Pacheco was shot and killed by police.
2020-03-31	John H. Ross II (29)	Unknown	Virginia (Rockingham County)	Ross was shot and killed by police officers.
2020-03-30	Daniel Prude (41)	Black	New York (Rochester)	
2020-03-30	Sterling L. Chest Jr. (45)	Black	Massachusetts (Springfield)	
2020-03-30	Jessie Stringfield (44)	White	Kentucky (Louisville)	Stringfield was shot and killed by police.
2020-03-30	Etonne Tanzymore (38)	Black	Maryland (Baltimore)	Tanzymore was shot and killed by police.
2020-03-29	Jacob E. Mcilveen (22)	White	Arizona (Phoenix)	Mcilveen was shot and killed by police after shooting and killing one officer and wounding 2 others.
2020-03-28	Shane Farwell (46)	White	Idaho (Caldwell)	Farwell was shot and killed by police.
2020-03-28	Thomas Owens (49)	Unknown	Kentucky (Gray)	Owens was shot and killed by police.
2020-03-27	Unnamed person	Unknown race	Florida (Lehigh Acres)	
2020-03-27	Tyrell "Rex" Fincher (26)	Black	New York (Newburgh)	Fincher was shot and killed by police.
2020-03-27	William Patrick Floyd (51)	Unknown	Oregon (Salem)	Floyd was shot and killed by police.
2020-03-27	Dawawn McCoy (36)	Black	Oklahoma (Oklahoma City)	
2020-03-27	Robert Harman Sword (46)	White	Virginia (Buchanan)	Sword was shot and killed by police.
2020-03-26	John Mark Hendrick Jr. (32)	White	North Carolina (Linwood)	Hendrick was shot and killed by police.
2020-03-26	Deanne Marie Owsianiak (55)	White	Florida (Ormond Beach)	Owsianiak was shot and killed by police officers.
2020-03-25	Unnamed man	Unknown race	Montana (Browning)	
2020-03-25	Matthew Moore (19)	White	Nevada (Pahrump)	On March 25, 2020, Law Enforcement was dispatched to a home after reports of a stabbing. After interviewing the victim of the stabbing, who knew the suspect, the responding officers arrived to Moore's home. Upon arrival, Moore's mother answered the door and told the officers she would be right back. Around 30 seconds later she opened the door and Moore leaned over her shoulder and fired 4 shots at Detective Bryan Cooper, knocking Cooper to the ground. Cooper fired 2 shots, reportedly missing Moore. Moore stood over Cooper, preparing to execute the detective. Detective Logan Gibbs, who had been to the side of the house fired 13 shots, killing Moore. Detective Cooper is in stable condition
2020-03-25	Glenn A. White (53)	White	Arizona (London)	White was shot and killed by police.
2020-03-24	Timothy Wilson (36)		Missouri (Kansas City)	FBI agents attempted to detain Wilson as he picked up an inert explosive device for use in domestic terrorism, when a firefight suddenly erupted and Wilson was shot. He was taken to hospital but was pronounced dead.
2020-03-24	Kathryn R. Hale (32)	White	Washington (Shelton)	Hale was shot and killed by police.
2020-03-24	Mauricio Hernandez (31)	Hispanic	Texas (El Paso)	Hernandez was shot and killed by police.
2020-03-24	Christopher Joel Mock (45)	White	North Carolina (Winston-Salem)	Mock was shot and killed by police.
2020-03-24	Michael Wallace (34)	White	New York (Schenectady)	Two officers responded to a domestic dispute call at Wallace's residence, and a report that he had threatened his apartment building's superintendent with a gun. As the officers attempted to make contact with the occupants, Wallace opened the door and pointed what appeared to be a firearm at the officers. The two officers responded by firing an undisclosed amount of shots. Schenectady Police Chief Eric Clifford said Wallace was believed to be holding a BB or pellet gun. Wallace was transported to the hospital where he died shortly after.
2020-03-24	Gordon A. Castro		Northern Mariana Islands (San Antonio)	Castro was shot and killed by police after killing his girlfriend during a hostage situation.
2020-03-23	Daniel Prude (41)		New York (Rochester)	Daniel Prude, who suffered from mental health issues was restrained by police, who later put a spit hood over his head after he spat at officers. They then put his head on the ground and held his head against the ground for two minutes after confrontation with him and the officers. After three minutes he started having spasms and trouble breathing. When officers noticed water leaking from his mouth, they released his neck, but he did not respond. After medical services arrived and performed CPR, he was pronounced brain dead from lack of oxygen shortly after 3:27 a.m. while in the ambulance. He was taken off of life support a little while later and died in the hospital. His death caused protests in September after the body camera footage was released due to the controversial instances of his death.
2020-03-23	Charles Edward Walsh (50)	White	California (Mojave)	Walsh was shot and killed by police.
2020-03-23	Carlos Delgado (46)	Hispanic	Texas (San Antonio)	Delgado was shot and killed by police.
2020-03-22	Gerald Johnson (55)	Unknown	California (Sacramento)	Johnson was shot and killed by police.
2020-03-21	Israel Lucas (30)	Unknown	California (Mojave)	Lucas was shot and killed by police.
2020-03-21	Bryan Pena (28)	Unknown	Utah (Taylorsville)	Pena was shot and killed by police.
2020-03-21	Charles Thomas Evans (52)	Unknown race	Florida (Pine Ridge)	
2020-03-21	Peter C. Albers (21)	Unknown race	Missouri (Villa Ridge)	
2020-03-21	Charles Lorentz (25)	White	New Mexico (Carlsbad Caverns National Park)	A National Park ranger pulled Lorentz over for speeding. A struggled ensued in which the ranger deployed his taser twice, which was ineffective. The ranger shot Lorentz after he allegedly tried to grab the ranger's gun.
2020-03-20	Kamall Koby Edwards (18)	Black	Georgia (Cuthbert)	Edwards was shot and killed by police.
2020-03-20	Alvin Lamont Baum (23)	Black	Virginia (Virginia Beach)	Baum was shot and killed by police.
2020-03-20	Mychael Johnson (31)	Black	Florida (Tallahassee)	Johnson was shot and killed by police officers.
2020-03-20	Larry Millraney (39)	White	Tennessee (Franklin County)	Millraney was shot and killed by police.
2020-03-19	Kyle Anthony Eichler (33)	White	Missouri (Wheeling)	Eichler was shot and killed by police.
2020-03-19	Charles Parker (47)	White	New York (Port Jervis)	Parker was shot and killed by police.
2020-03-18	Unnamed man	Unknown race	Florida (Port Richey)	
2020-03-18	Steven Alire (51)	White	Colorado (Orchard Mesa)	Alire was shot and killed by police.
2020-03-18	Lebarron Ballard (28)	Black	Texas (Abilene)	Ballard was shot and killed by police
2020-03-18	Harold Spencer (39)	Black	Louisiana (Iota)	Harold Spencer was shot and killed by police.
2020-03-18	Allen F. Boehnlein (58)	White	Indiana (Granger)	
2020-03-17	Steven Alire (51)	White	Colorado (Grand Junction)	
2020-03-17	Jose Luis Lopez-Rodriguez (40)	Unknown race	California (Richmond)	
2020-03-17	William Simpkins (39)	Black	Georgia (Atlanta)	Simpkins was shot and killed by police.
2020-03-16	Unnamed person	Unknown race	Florida (Naranja)	
2020-03-16	Raymundo Aaron Ceja (32)		California (Santa Clarita)	Ceja drove into the Santa Clarita Valley Sheriff’s Station parking lot and approached officers loading their cars with what appeared to be a gun. Officers responded to the threat by shooting Ceja. Ceja was hit and taken to hospital where he later died. It was later determined that the weapon Ceja was carrying was an airsoft gun designed to look like a real firearm. Police are investigating if the incident was a suicide by cop.
2020-03-16	Darwin Foy (35)	Black	Iowa (Webster City)	Foy was shot and killed by police.
2020-03-16	Marvin O'Reilly (55)	Unknown	Arizona (Tucson)	O'Reilly was shot and killed by police.
2020-03-16	Juanito Ovalle (58)	Hispanic	Texas (San Antonio)	Ovalle was shot and killed by police.
2020-03-16	Charity Thome (42)	White	Pennsylvania (Myerstown)	Thome was shot and killed by police.
2020-03-16	Eric E. Briceno (39)	Hispanic	California (Maywood)	
2020-03-15	Darrell W. Mobley Sr. (48)	Black	New York (Syracuse)	
2020-03-15	Douglas J. Foster (47)	White	Montana (Lewistown)	Foster was shot and killed by police.
2020-03-15	Catherine Gomez (25)	Hispanic	California (Long Beach)	Gomez was shot and killed by police.
2020-03-15	Michael Brandon Potter (33)	White	North Carolina (High Point)	Potter was shot and killed by police officers.
2020-03-15	Dakota Yancey (19)	White	Virginia (Chase City)	Yancey was shot and killed by police.
2020-03-14	Chase Eldon Brooks (32)	White	Oregon (Springfield)	Brooks was shot and killed by police.
2020-03-14	Unnamed person (48)	Unknown race	Florida (Cocoa)	
2020-03-14	Jesse Cedillo (30)	White	California (Lodi)	Cedillo was shot and killed by police officers.
2020-03-14	Rory Edwin Murray (30)	Unknown	California (Lodi)	Murray was shot and killed by police.
2020-03-14	Justin Riggs (30)	White	Kentucky (Louisville)	Riggs was shot and killed by police officers.
2020-03-14	Jeremiah Medina (31)	Hispanic	New Mexico (Taos)	Medina was shot and killed by police.
2020-03-13	Rosario Angel Alvarado (41)	Hispanic	Arizona (Chandler)	Alvarado was shot and killed by police.
2020-03-13	Jorge Martinez (30)	Hispanic	Oklahoma (Rogers County)	Martinez was shot and killed by police.
2020-03-13	Marc Morgan (62)	White	Pennsylvania (New Kensington)	Morgan was shot and killed by police.
2020-03-13	Christopher Mullins (40)	White	Tennessee (Murfreesboro)	Mullins was shot and killed by police.
2020-03-13	Dung Nguyen (50)	Asian	Texas (Garland)	Nguyen was shot and killed by police.
2020-03-13	Oral Nunis (56)	Black	California (Chula Vista)	Nunis died during arrest by Chula Vista Police after suffering a mental health crisis.
2020-03-13	Breonna Taylor (26)	Black	Kentucky (Louisville)	Breonna Taylor, a 26-year-old African-American emergency medical technician, was fatally shot by Louisville Metro Police Department (LMPD) officers on March 13, 2020. Three LMPD officers executing a no-knock search warrant entered her apartment in Louisville, Kentucky. Gunfire was exchanged between Taylor's boyfriend Kenneth Walker and the officers. Walker said he believed that the officers were intruders. The LMPD officers fired over twenty shots. Taylor was shot eight times and LMPD Sergeant Jonathan Mattingly was injured by gunfire. Another police officer and an LMPD lieutenant were on the scene when the warrant was executed.
2020-03-12	Duncan Lemp (21)	White	Maryland (Potomac)	Duncan Socrates Lemp was fatally shot at his home in Potomac, Maryland during a no-knock police raid by the Montgomery County Police Department’s SWAT team. Lemp was a student and a software developer who associated himself with the 3 Percenters, a militia group.
2020-03-12	Donnie Sanders (47)	Black	Missouri (Kansas City)	Sanders was shot and killed by police.
2020-03-11	Mary Kate Field (32)	White	Alaska (Anchor Point)	Field was shot and killed by police.
2020-03-11	Joshua C. Noles (37)	White	Florida (St. Johns County)	Noles was shot and killed by police.
2020-03-10	Joshua R. Kessinger (37)	White	Missouri (St. Louis)	
2020-03-10	Pablo Elias (44)	Hispanic	California (Bell Gardens)	Elias was shot and killed by police.
2020-03-09	Heather J. Mock (35)		New York (Utica)	Christopher Conkling entered Mock's home and shot a third person, Andrew Pruitt, in the head. Conkling abducted Mock to his home where he shot and killed her and then himself. Pruitt later recovered. Conkling and Mock were previously engaged but had been separated for about a year. All three were employed as corrections officers at the Marcy Correctional Facility.
2020-03-09	Jesus Bonito Garcia (47)	Hispanic	Texas (Elmendorf)	Garcia was shot and killed by police.
2020-03-09	Jennifer Taylor (43)	White	California (Dinuba)	Taylor was shot and killed by police.
2020-03-08	Desiree N. Garza (29)	Hispanic	California (Torrance)	Garza was shot and killed by police.
2020-03-08	Charles Harwood (65)	Unknown	Alabama (Montgomery)	Harwood was shot and killed by police.
2020-03-08	Keith P. Haux (57)	White	Minnesota (Backus)	Haux was shot and killed by police.
2020-03-08	Brian Marksberry (31)		Texas (Humble)	Marksberry was shot and killed by police.
2020-03-08	Lawson E. Schaber (82)	White	Arizona (Apache Junction)	Schaber was shot and killed by police.
2020-03-08	Zachery Anderson Jr. (28)	Black	Texas (Humble)	
2020-03-08	Aaron Tolen (37)	White	Alaska (Wasilla)	Tolen was shot and killed by police.
2020-03-07	Gary Brown (43)	White	Ohio (Harrison Township)	Brown was shot and killed by police.
2020-03-07	Matthew A. Miller (33)	Unknown	Pennsylvania (Stroudsburg)	Miller was shot and killed by police.
2020-03-06	Jacob Frausto (41)	Unknown	Arizona (Tucson)	Frausto was shot and killed by police.
2020-03-06	Jerry Gaghins (42)	White	Oklahoma (Tulsa)	Gaghins was shot and killed by police.
2020-03-06	Barry Gedeus (27)	Black	Florida (Fort Lauderdale)	Gedeus was shot and killed by police.
2020-03-06	Tyler M. Jones (24)	Black	Ohio (Fairfield)	Jones was shot and killed by police.
2020-03-06	Kenneth Mullins (32)	White	California (Fresno County)	Mullins was shot and killed by police.
2020-03-05	Ajay Kamil Ayseli (31)		Virginia (Henrico)	Ayseli was shot and killed by police.
2020-03-05	Gene Beasley (64)	White	Alabama (Ariton)	Beasley was shot and killed by police.
2020-03-05	Elijah J. Brewer (25)	Black	Pennsylvania (Pittsburgh)	Brewer was shot and killed by police.
2020-03-05	Curtis Hass (34)	Unknown race	Missouri (Columbia)	
2020-03-05	Devan A. Twilley (25)	Black	Indiana (Hamilton Township)	
2020-03-04	Christopher Palmer (37)	White	Arkansas (Manila)	Palmer was shot and killed by police.
2020-03-04	David John Beckes (41)	White	Minnesota (St. Cloud)	
2020-03-04	Gary Lee Tierney Sr. (73)	Unknown	North Carolina (Fayetteville)	Tierney was shot and killed by police.
2020-03-03	Ryan E. Bass (39)	White	Washington (Riverside)	Bass was shot and killed by police.
2020-03-03	Manuel Ellis (33)		Washington (Tacoma)	Officers alleged that Ellis initiated a confrontation by striking a police car and attacking officers. An eyewitness however, has stated that Ellis was having a friendly conversation with 2 officers when another officer threw open his car door and knocked Ellis to the ground while assaulting him. During the assault Ellis continually stated "I can't breathe" and was filmed by an eyewitness. The Pierce County medical examiner, ruled the death a homicide due to physical restraint.
2020-03-03	Jose Antonio Gainza (49)		Florida (Miami-Dade)	Gainza was shot and killed by police.
2020-03-02	Terry Cagle (73)		Texas (Sherman)	Cagle was shot and killed by police.
2020-03-02	Cody Hodges (34)		Louisiana (Keithville)	Hodges was shot and killed by police.
2020-03-01	Raymundo Aaron Ceja (32)		California (Santa Clarita)	Ceja was shot and killed by police.
2020-03-01	Joshua Russell (35)		Colorado (Pueblo)	Russell was shot and killed by police.
2020-03-01	Ian Austin Wilson (31)		North Carolina (Mocksville)	Wilson was shot and killed by police.
2020-03-01	Matthew Ray Chapa (17)	White	Texas (Houston)	
2020-03-01	Christopher Alvarez	Hispanic	California (Santa Ana)	

== See also ==
- Death in custody § United States
- Henry A. Wallace Police Crime Public Database
- List of cases of police brutality
- List of countries with annual rates and counts for killings by law enforcement officers
- List of law enforcement officers killed in the line of duty in the United States
- List of law enforcement officers convicted for an on-duty killing in the United States
- List of shootings by US immigration agents
- List of police reforms related to the George Floyd protests
- List of unarmed African Americans killed by law enforcement officers in the United States
- Lists of killings by law enforcement officers
- Police brutality in the United States
- Police misconduct § United States
- Police riot § United States
- Police use of deadly force in the United States
