= No justice, no peace =

Human rights slogan

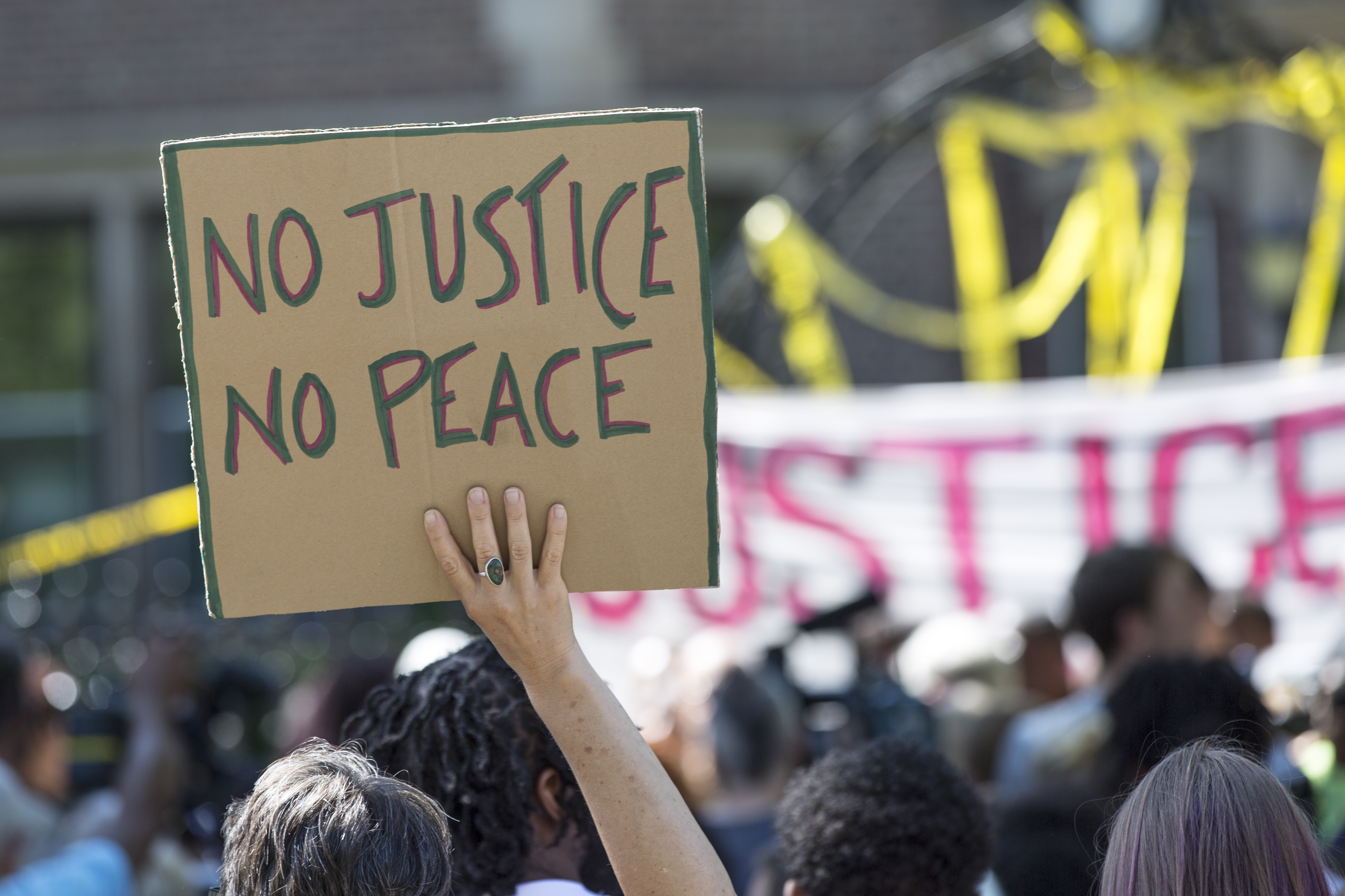
- Sign at a rally following the 2016 shooting of Philando Castile
- Meaning: contested but either: there is no peace because there is no justice; there will be no peace until there is justice; if there is no justice, there is no peace

"No justice, no peace" is a political slogan which originated during protests against acts of ethnic violence against African Americans. Its precise meaning is contested. The slogan was used as early as 1986, following the killing of Michael Griffith by a mob of youths.

== History ==
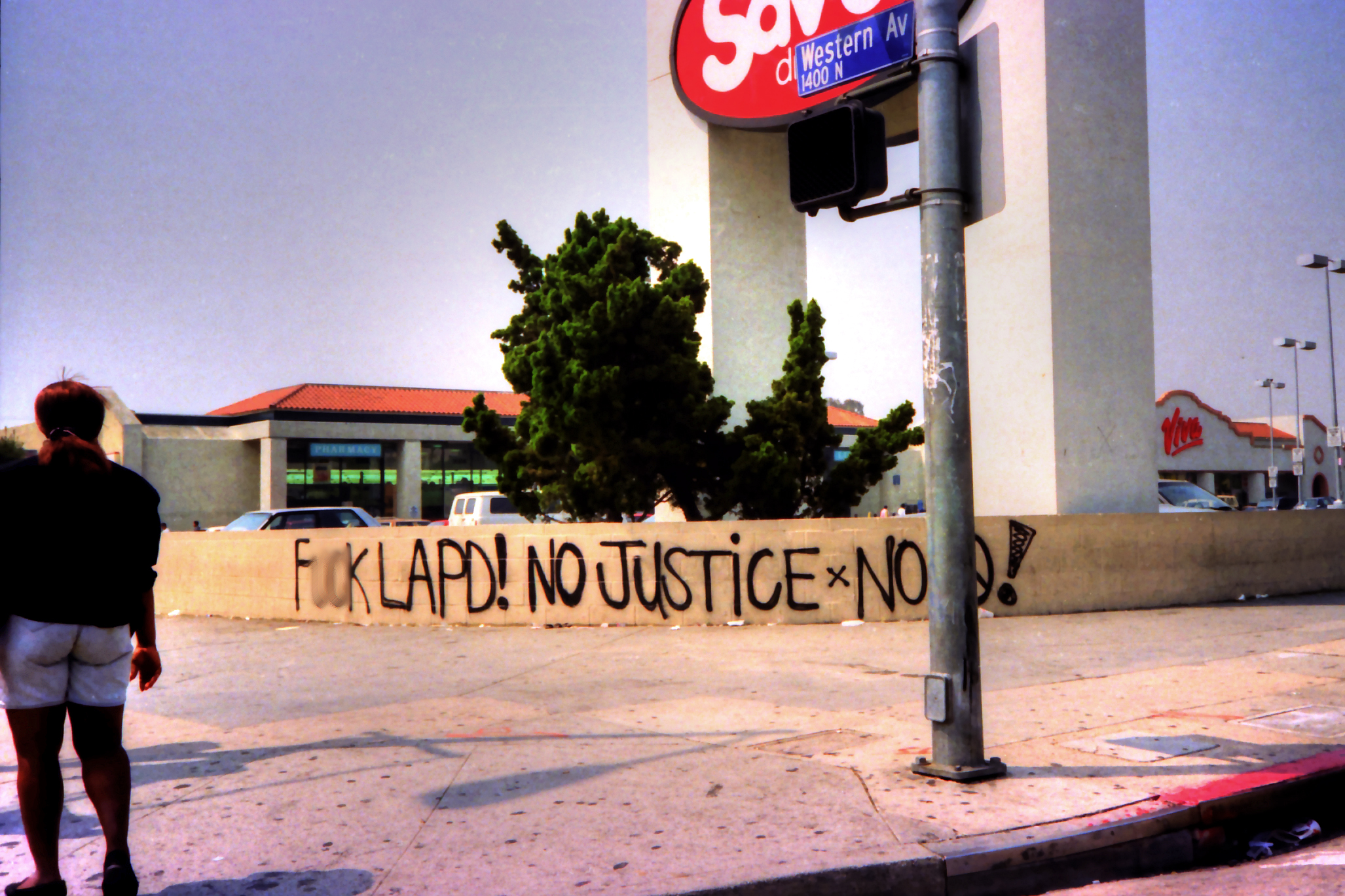
Graffiti during the 1992 Los Angeles riots after the acquittal of white police officers in the beating of Rodney King

Linguist Ben Zimmer writes that use of the slogan "No justice, no peace" during protests goes back as far as the 1986 killing of Michael Griffith. Griffith, a Trinidadian immigrant, and three friends, all black, were assaulted by a mob of white youths in the Howard Beach, Queens, New York City. Griffith fled the attackers onto a nearby highway, where he was fatally struck by a passing car. In 2014, civil-rights activist Al Sharpton recounted: "In the midst of the protest, someone yelled the slogan, 'No justice, no peace'. Others began doing the same, and from then on I adopted it as a rallying cry each and every time a grave miscarriage of justice has befallen the disenfranchised."

Other sources suggest that the phrase was actually popularized by activist Robert "Sonny" Carson, who is quoted on February 12, 1987 as stating, "'No justice! No peace!' [...] 'No peace for all of you who dare kill our children if they come into your neighborhood...We are going to make one long, hot summer out here...get ready for a new black in this city!," while the New York Times reported on July 6, 1987: "'No justice, no peace,' said Mr. Carson repeatedly in what he said he hopes will emerge as the rallying cry for his cause." Carson appears to have used the phrase conditionally.

The phrase appears even earlier on a painting by Jean-Michel Basquiat, Created Equal, in 1984..

The 1992 Los Angeles riots are remembered for the use of the slogan, which expressed collective frustration with the existing political order.

The slogan is paraphrased in the song Baltimore by Prince.

== Conditional or conjunctive ==
Protestors chanting "No justice, no peace, no more racist police" in Chapel Hill, North Carolina, after the murder of George Floyd

The meaning of "no justice, no peace" may change between conditional and conjunctive depending on the speaker. In the conditional interpretation, the slogan is rendered as an "if-then" statement, which implies that peaceful action is impossible without justice, and which urges citizens to demonstrate against injustice even if doing so results in violence. Ben Zimmer writes that during the 1980s and '90s, "'No justice, no peace' was unequivocally understood as conditional, not conjunctive", such as in a 1988 statement by lawyer Ron Kuby before the U.S. House of Representatives Subcommittee on Criminal Justice:

'No Justice, No Peace' [...] summarizes the frustration and anger of New York's Black and Latino communities. 'No Justice, No Peace' remains the solemn promise of an increasing number of people in an increasingly polarized city.

After the 2014 shooting of Tamir Rice, journalist Glen Ford wrote:

More than just a threat against Power, the slogan brings clarity of purpose to the participants in the movement. If the existing structures of governance and social organization cannot possibly provide justice for Black people, then those structures must be pushed aside – or there will be no civil peace.

By contrast, in the conjunctive interpretation, one is stating that neither peace or justice can exist without the other. After the acquittal in the Trayvon Martin murder case, the chaplain of the University of Pennsylvania said, "A lack of justice has resulted in a lack of peace", "Heavy hearts now lack peace because of the lack of justice in our nation", and "No peace because of no justice." Sharpton writes, "'No justice, no peace' [...] is a way to expose inequality that would otherwise be ignored."

== Similar phrases ==
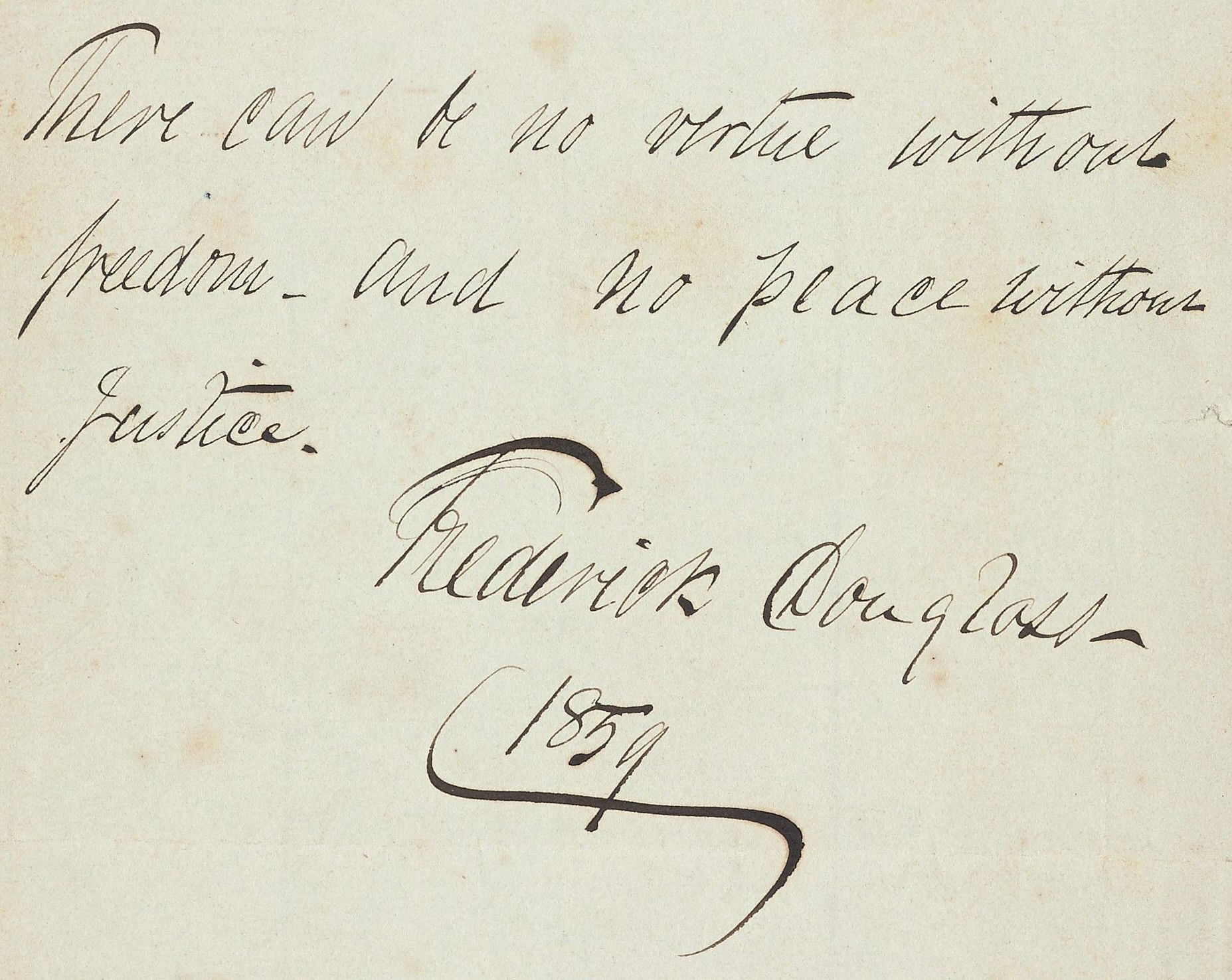
1859 autograph note by Frederick Douglass: "There can be no virtue without freedom, and no peace without justice"

Yuvraj Joshi traces a longer history of "peace-justice claims" made by activists including Martin Luther King Jr., Bayard Rustin and A. Philip Randolph. In 1967, King visited Santa Rita Jail in California, where protesters against the Vietnam War were imprisoned. There, he drew an explicit parallel between the anti-war movement and the Civil Rights Movement. Using a phrase that is explicitly conjunctive, King said, "There can be no justice without peace. And there can be no peace without justice."

King had previously used the same phrase in a letter to Willem Visser 't Hooft following King's receipt of the Nobel Peace Prize, and in a 1965 television appearance where he reaffirmed his call for an end to the war, stating:

There can be no peace in the world unless there's justice, and there can be no justice without peace. I think in a sense these problems are inextricably bound together.

During the January 1972 World Day of Peace celebrations, Pope Paul VI said, "If you want peace, work for justice."

=== Variants ===
==== ...No racist police ====
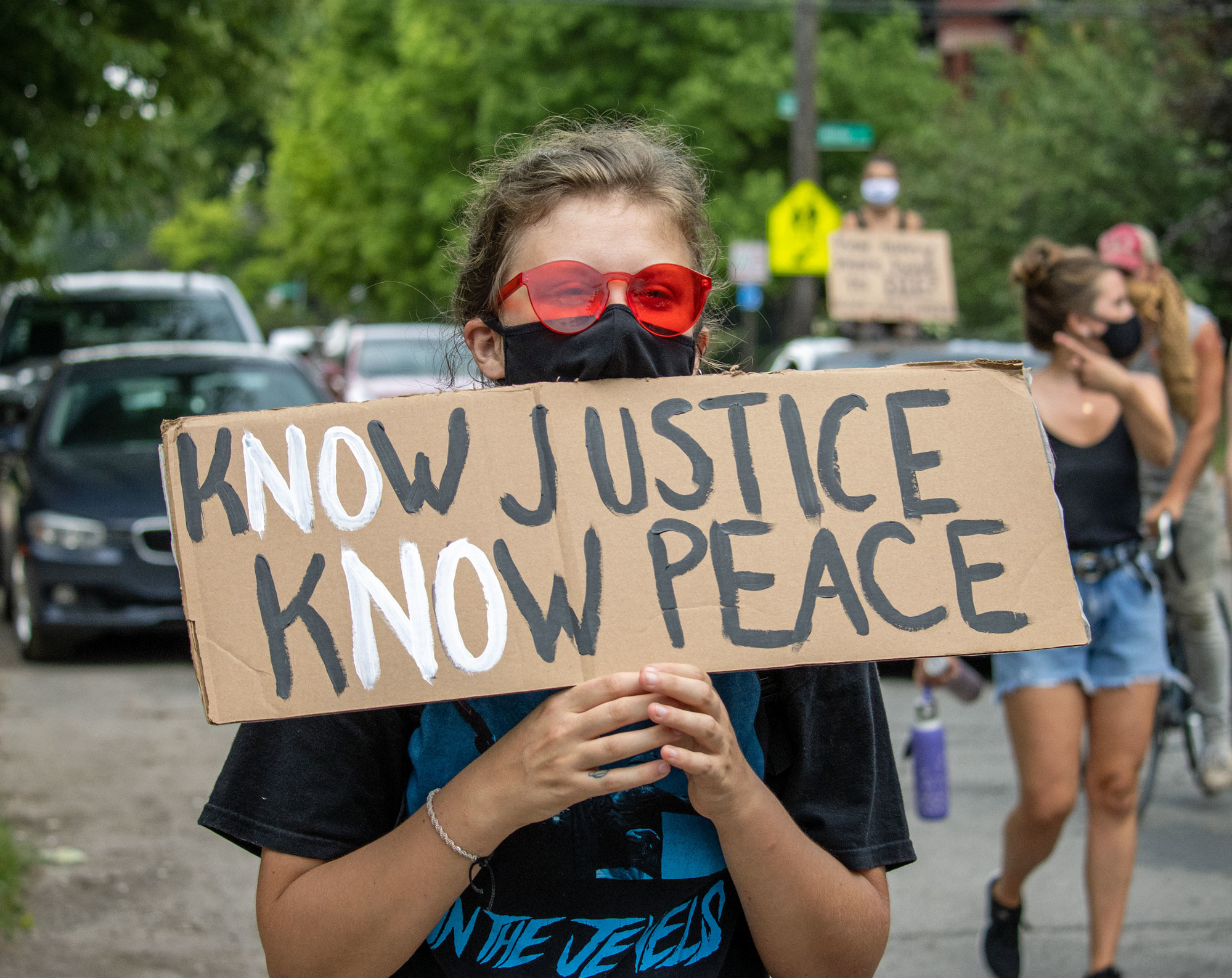
Protester with a sign reading "Know Justice Know Peace"

The variant "No justice, no peace, no racist police" has been recorded in print since at least 1995. This followed the murder of Joseph Gould, a homeless black man, by an off-duty white Chicago police officer, who fled the scene of the crime while Gould lay dying. Related variants include "No justice, no peace, no more racist police" and "No justice, no peace. Fuck these racist-ass police."

==== Know Justice, Know Peace ====
A homophonic variant is know justice, know peace. It is used for a Dr. Martin Luther King Jr. Early College podcast, the 2020 Know Justice Know Peace Resolution by the Denver Public Schools Board to better include persons of color in district school curriculums, and a U.S. Jesuit anti-racism retreat.

==== No Justice, No Street ====
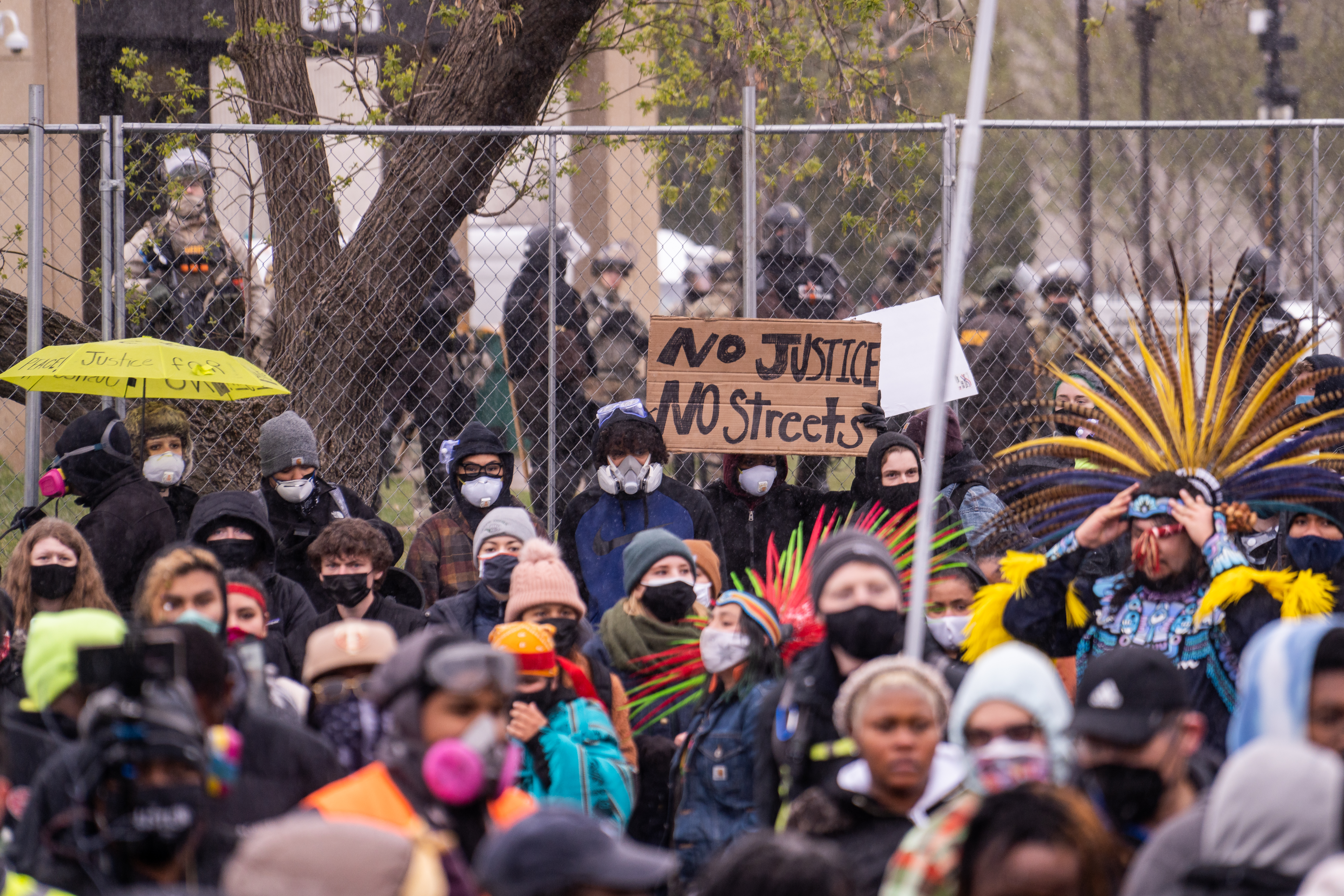
A "no justice, no streets" placard at Daunte Wright protests on April 11, 2021

The variant "no justice, no street" or "no justice, no streets" relates to a disagreement about the fate of George Floyd Square, created in the aftermath of the murder of George Floyd in May 2020. In early August 2020, Minneapolis announced that they would reopen the intersection that the Square is located on. However, activists who maintained the barricades around the intersection demanded $156 million in various anti-racism initiatives before they would release control.

== See also ==
- Hands up, don't shoot – Slogan and gesture
- I can't breathe – Human rights slogan
