= Hands up, don't shoot =

Slogan and gesture

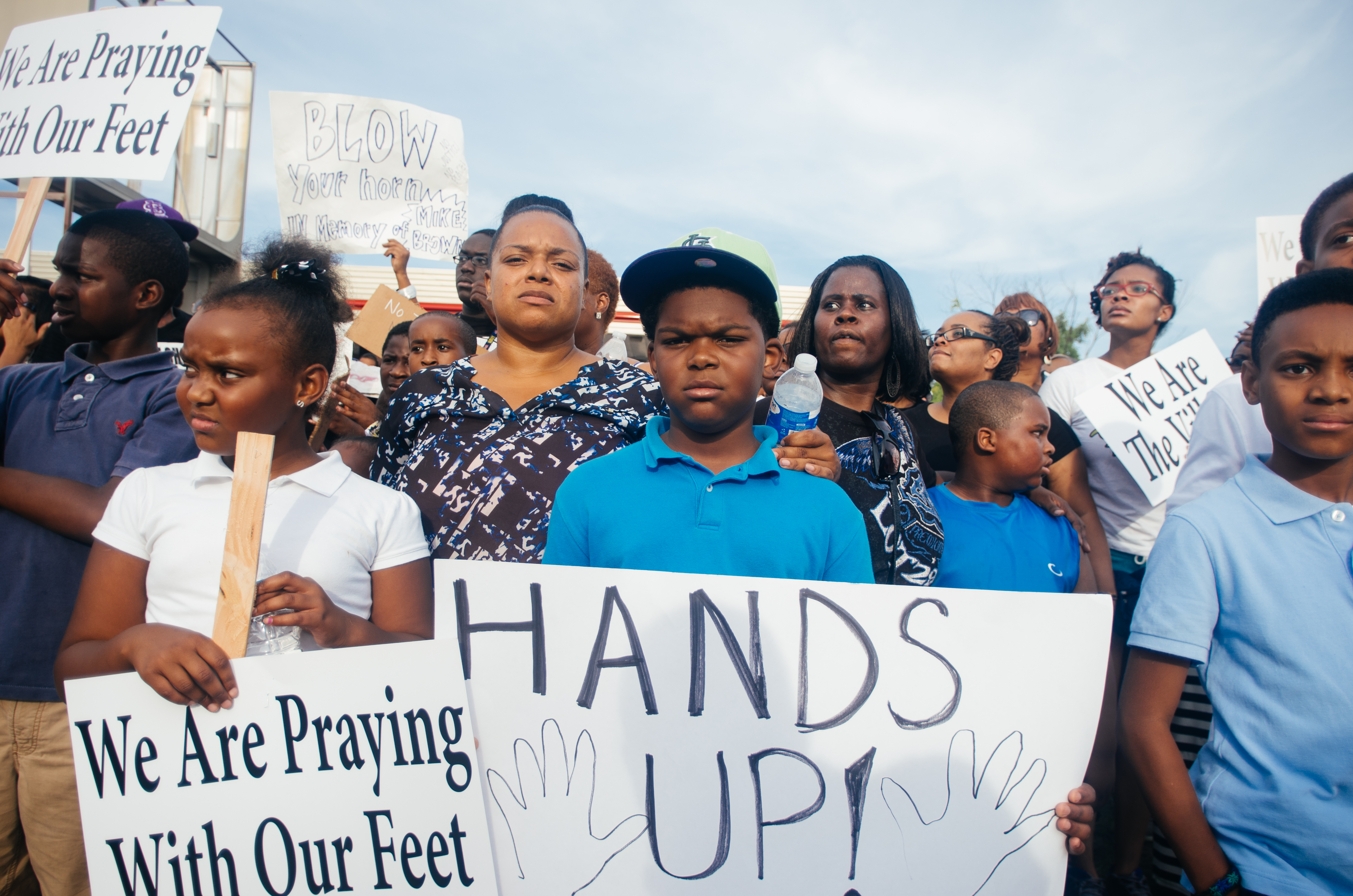
- "Hands up!" sign at a protest in Ferguson, Missouri in August 2014
- Context: Killing of Michael Brown
- Meaning: One has their hands in the air, a common sign of submission, and is therefore not a threat

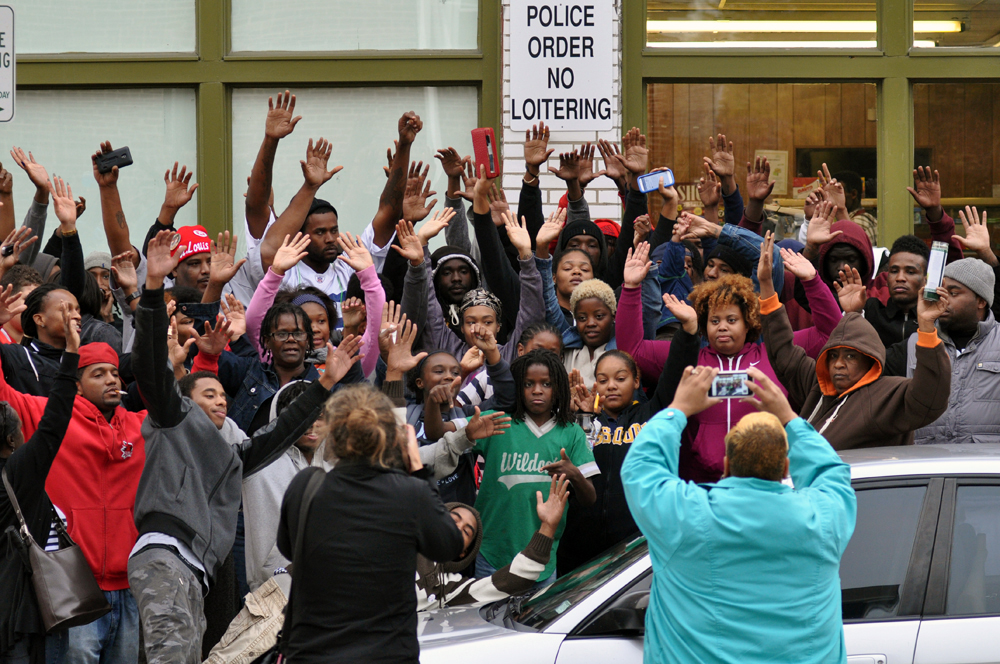
Group of people in Shaw, St. Louis with their hands raised in October 2014

"Hands up, don't shoot", sometimes shortened to "hands up", is a slogan and gesture that originated after the August 9, 2014, police killing of Michael Brown in Ferguson, Missouri, and then adopted at protests against police brutality elsewhere in the United States. The slogan implies one has their hands in the air, a common sign of submission, and is therefore not a threat to an approaching police officer. The slogan originated with initial reports that claimed Michael Brown had his hands up when he was shot, which were later found to be untrue.

== Investigation ==
On March 4, 2015, the Department of Justice, headed by President Obama appointment Eric Holder, released their report of the investigation into the events. President Obama said of the investigation that he had "complete confidence and [stands] fully behind the Justice Department...” This report found that physical and forensic evidence contradicted witnesses who claimed that Brown had his hands up when Wilson shot him. It also stated that witnesses whose testimony aligned with the physical and forensic evidence never "perceived Brown to be attempting to surrender at any point when Wilson fired upon him." The report concluded there was no justification for a federal prosecution of Officer Wilson.

== Origin and backstory ==
The first recorded incident of "Hands up" being chanted at a protest was during student protests in London in 2009. Trapped by riot police on Westminster bridge, some protesters raised their hands to demonstrate that they were not instigating the police violence and shouted "Hands up" to encourage others to do the same.

On Saturday, August 9, 2014, Michael Brown and Dorian Johnson were walking together in Ferguson, Missouri after Brown robbed a convenience store. They were stopped by Officer Darren Wilson. There is still no clear report of exactly what transpired between this point of the incident and when Brown was shot because of major inconsistencies in the witnesses' stories. Wilson claimed that Brown reached into his police SUV for the officer's gun, but prosecutors were neither able to confirm nor disprove this. After the altercation near the vehicle, the official incident report says that Brown ran away from the vehicle. Then, Brown turned back around and started moving back toward the officer. Officer Wilson claimed he feared for the safety of his life, and that is when he shot and killed Michael Brown.

One recurring feature in Dorian Johnson's eyewitness account of the incident was that Michael Brown put his hands in the air during the encounter with Officer Wilson. This claim was never investigated or vetted by anyone in the mainstream media, and was repeatedly broadcast as fact, causing more tension over this narrative. A typical recollection by Dorian Johnson was phrased as "[Michael Brown] turned around, and he put his hands in the air, and he started to get down." Three days after the killing of Michael Brown, Johnson told MSNBC that Brown said, "I don’t have a gun, stop shooting!" On March 4, 2015, the U.S. Department of Justice issued a report on the shooting, which said, "There is no witness who has stated that Brown had his hands up in surrender whose statement is otherwise consistent with the physical evidence" and "our investigation did not reveal any eyewitness who stated that Brown said 'don't shoot'."

The "hands up, don't shoot" chant would in fact be popularized by Johnson's account of the shooting.

In addition to Johnson, several witnesses to the shooting of Michael Brown described him as having his hands up during the encounter. However, no one else recalled Brown asking Wilson not to shoot his firearm. However, the March 2015 U.S. Department of Justice report noted how the several witnesses contradicting Wilson's version of events recanted their initial claims and made inconsistent statements.

Impromptu protests erupted immediately after the shooting. Tension between the community and the police escalated quickly. Shortly after the shooting, Brown's stepfather held a placard that read "Ferguson police just executed my unarmed son!!!" By 8:30 that same evening, demonstrators were chanting "We are Michael Brown!" They also marched to the headquarters of the Ferguson Police Department, where they chanted "No justice! No peace!" Residents also held their hands in the air and said to police officers "Don't shoot me!" The St. Louis Post-Dispatch photographed protesters with their hands in the air shouting "Don't shoot us!" at the police.

The community reaction to Michael Brown's death continued through Sunday, August 10 with a variety of actions, including more protests and a vigil, as well as widespread looting and arson attacks on local businesses. On Monday, August 11, as the FBI promised to investigate the shooting, and the NAACP organized a meeting in the community, the hands up gesture was continuing to be employed by protesters who were emulating what they understood to be the final posture of Michael Brown. After the looting on Sunday, police officers were equipped with rubber bullets and tear gas on Monday night. During a standoff with police, several men approached officers with their hands raised saying, "Don't shoot me."

The hands-up pose had been widely adopted by protesters throughout the weekend. The gesture was often paired with the phrase "Don't shoot me" or "Don't shoot us." During the demonstrations on Monday, the media first documented the posture and the phrase being combined into the slogan "Hands Up, Don't Shoot."

Brown's death took place after the deaths of Eric Garner and Trayvon Martin. In the wake of Trayvon Martin's death, the BlackLivesMatter movement exploded in mainstream media. According to the movement's website, it “began as a call to action in response to state-sanctioned violence and anti-Black racism.” From that moment forward, it was an ongoing protest that was only amplified by the deaths of Michael Brown and the others. Many Black Lives Matter activists traveled to Ferguson in Protest of Brown's death. These activists claim that social media has exploded the conversation about these movements, and police brutality in general. The “Hands up, don’t shoot!” slogan/gesture was adopted and is still used by BlackLivesMatter activists because of the synonymous origins and causes of both movements.

== Use ==
Protestors chant "Hands up, don't shoot" after the murder of George Floyd

By Tuesday, August 13, "Hands Up, Don't Shoot" had become a defining slogan of the protests in Ferguson. The hands up gesture used widely by black males when dealing with Ferguson police was transformed into a weapon of protest. Al Sharpton encouraged demonstrators to use the gesture by saying, "If you're angry, throw your arms up. If you want justice, throw your arms up. Because that's the sign Michael was using. He had a surrender sign. That's the sign you have to deal with. Use the sign he last showed. We want answers why that last sign was not respected."

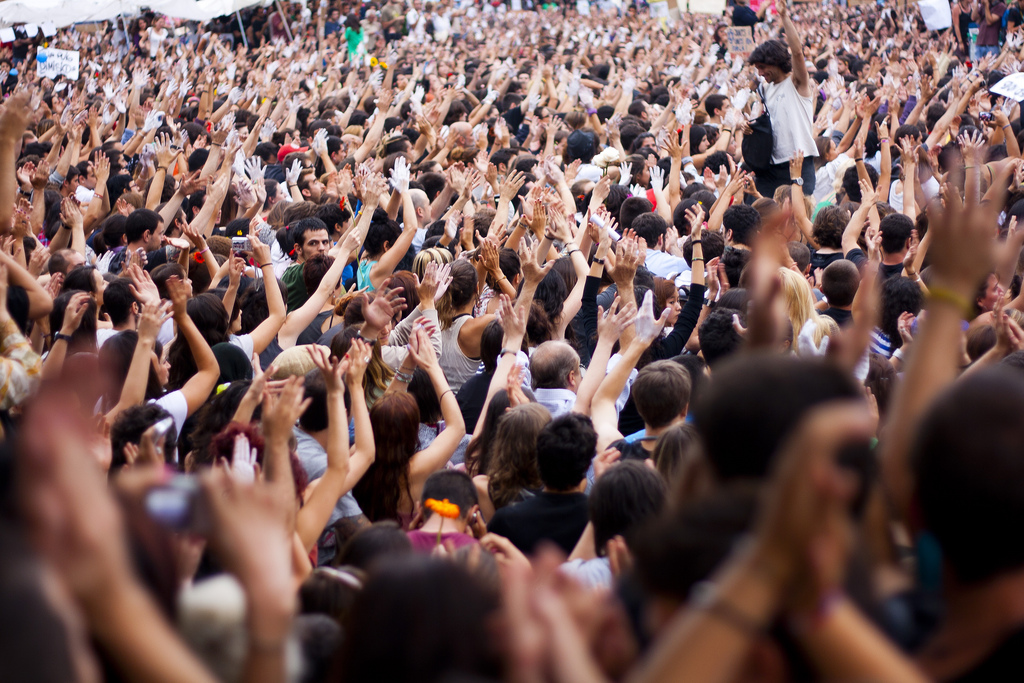
Student protest in Barcelona against police brutality with hands up

The phrase became a rallying cry for protesters and others trying to draw attention to the killing of Brown and other African Americans by police officers. In November 2014, some members of the St. Louis Rams ran out on the field during pregame introductions with their hands raised above their heads, an action repeated by four members of the Congressional Black Caucus on the House floor in December 2014. The hybrid slogan "Hands Up, Don't Shoot" quickly spread beyond the Ferguson protests. It was often said in solidarity with the protesters in Ferguson.

=== Black Lives Matter ===
Though the Black Lives Matter activist movement began in response to the death of Trayvon Martin two years earlier, it staged its first in-person national protest in the form of a "Black Lives Matter Freedom Ride" to Ferguson, Missouri three weeks after the shooting of Michael Brown. One of the rallying cries at those protests was "Hands Up, Don't Shoot". This became a common chant at Black Lives Matter protests, along with the dying words of Eric Garner ("I can't breathe"), and "No justice, no peace".

=== St. Louis Rams protest ===
On November 30, 2014, several players on the St. Louis Rams, (Tavon Austin, Stedman Bailey, Kenny Britt, Jared Cook and Chris Givens) entered the field during an NFL game making the gesture.

The St. Louis Police Officers Association said the act was "way out-of-bounds" and the organization "is profoundly disappointed with the members of the St. Louis Rams football team who chose to ignore the mountains of evidence released from the St. Louis County Grand Jury this week and engage in a display that police officers around the nation found tasteless, offensive, and inflammatory".

Rams Coach Jeff Fisher and a team spokesman said that they were unaware of the players' plans before the game and the players "were exercising their right to free speech". Against the St. Louis Police Officers Association's request, the NFL did not punish the players, because the gesture was political and unlike other major professional sports leagues NFL does not punish players for political gestures. The NFL's vice president of communications said, "We respect and understand the concerns of all individuals who have expressed views on this tragic situation."

Jared Cook, one of the Rams players, received threats after making the gesture.

=== Capitol Hill ===
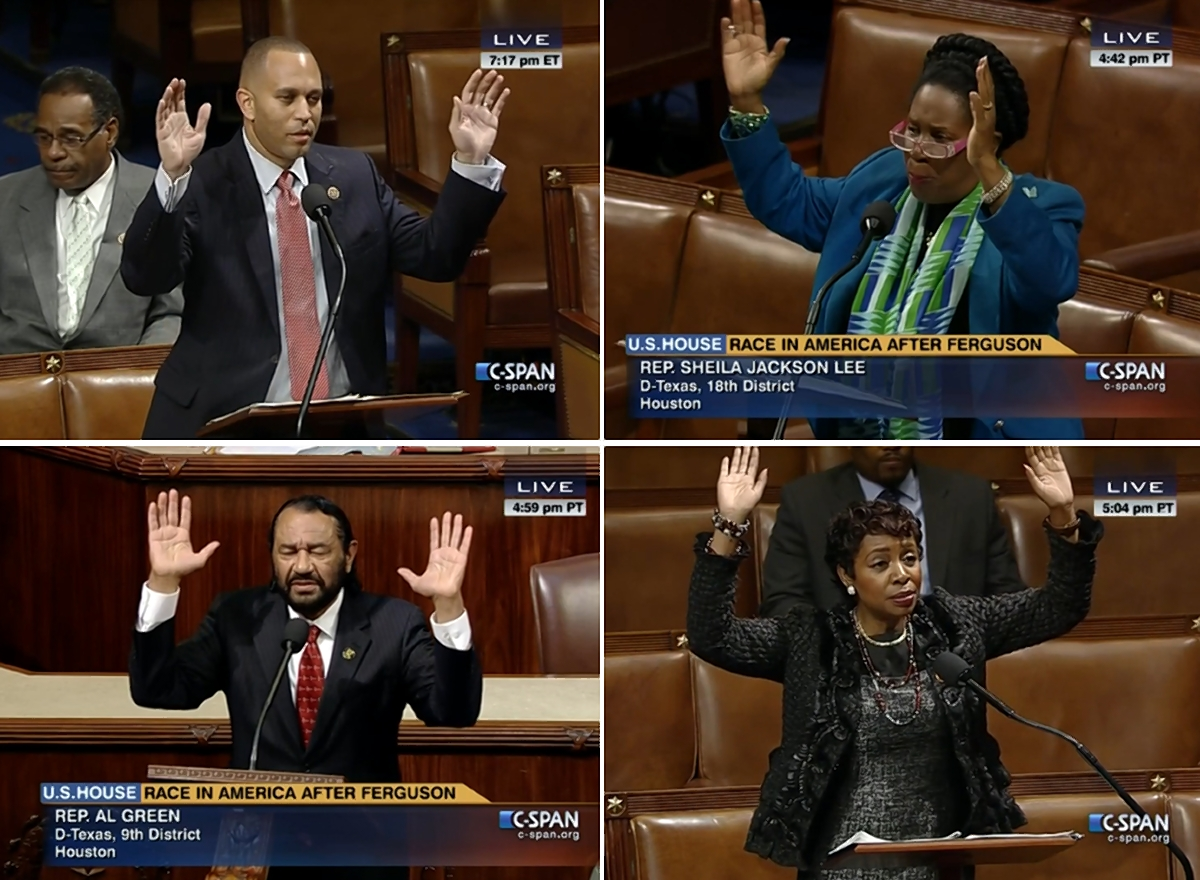
Reps. Jeffries (D-NY), Lee (D-Tex.), Green (D-Tex.) and Clarke (D-NY) making the gesture

On December 1, 2014, several lawmakers in the United States House of Representatives made the gesture to protest the shooting and police brutality. Rep. Hakeem Jeffries (D-New York) said on the floor:

Hands up, don't shoot. It's a rallying cry of people all across America who are fed up with police violence. In community, after community, after community, fed up with police violence in Ferguson, in Brooklyn, in Cleveland, in Oakland, in cities and counties and rural communities all across America.

Other members of the Congressional Black Caucus joining Jeffries were Reps. Yvette Clarke (D-New York), Al Green (D-Texas) and Sheila Jackson Lee (D-Texas), who praised the football players who made the gesture the night before.

On December 11, more than 150 black congressional staffers staged a walkout and silent protest in a display of unity with demonstrations against the Eric Garner and Brown grand jury decisions. Senate Chaplain Dr. Barry Black led the crowd in prayer. They were gathered there, Black said, to be a "voice for the voiceless". After prayer, the crowd of staff and lawmakers posed while making the gesture.

=== CNN Newsroom ===
On December 13, 2014, after a story about the ongoing protest, three members of the CNN Newsroom panel held up their hands while a fourth held up a sheet of paper reading "I can't breathe", a reference to the death of Eric Garner. "Our hearts are with [the protesters]" was stated, but "hands up, don't shoot" was not said during the broadcast. The gesture attracted criticism because it appeared on a program that was not supposed to be opinion-oriented.

=== In music ===
A Verge article stated that during Pharrell Williams' performance of the song "Happy" at the 57th Annual Grammy Awards, the singer and backup performers made the hands up gesture; however, the connection to the incident is speculation by the article's author.

Macklemore and Ryan Lewis reference the chanting of "hands up, don't shoot" in their song "White Privilege II".

On December 9, 2015, Daye Jack released the song "Hands up" about police brutality, in which he sings: "Living with my head down – Hands up – no no don’t shoot, don’t shoot" as a direct reference to the killing of Michael Brown.

American rapper Kanye West references the gesture in his song "Feedback" from his 2016 release The Life of Pablo with the lines "Hands up we just doing what the cops taught us. Hands up, hands up then the cops shot us."

Kimya Dawson's song "At the Seams" references the gesture, saying "Hands up, don't shoot, I can't breathe. Black Lives Matter, no justice no peace."

Experimental hip-hop group clipping. quotes the "hands up, don't shoot" motto in their song "Blood of the Fang," which largely deals with themes of racist violence in the American Civil Rights movement.

=== In religious art ===
In 2015 Rev. Mark Francisco Bozzuti-Jones, a priest at Trinity Episcopal Church in Manhattan, commissioned the icon Our Lady of Ferguson, which depicts the Madonna and Child with their hands up, in response to the Shooting of Michael Brown.

== Criticism ==
=== The Washington Post ===
In the wake of the report, many pundits began to refer to the "Hands up, Don't Shoot" slogan as "a lie" or "based on a lie". The Washington Post's Fact Checker feature gave "Hands Up, Don't Shoot" four Pinocchios denoting it as an outright lie.

Despite this, the slogan has an enduring symbolic meaning for activists. As one protester remarked, "Even if you don't find that it's true, it's a valid rallying cry... it's just a metaphor."

== See also ==
- Can't we all just get along?
- Don't Shoot Portland
- Don't tase me, bro!
- Driving while black
- List of gestures
- List of fatalities involving law enforcement officers in the United States, August 2014
- Killing of Adam Toledo
