= Our Lady of Ferguson =

2015 painting by Mark Dukes

- Artist: Mark Doox
- Year: 2015
- Type: icon, acrylic collage
- Location: Cathedral of St. John the Divine

Our Lady, Mother of Ferguson and All Those Killed by Gun Violence, simply known as Our Lady of Ferguson, is an icon of the Madonna and Child. The icon, which depicts the Virgin Mary as a Black Madonna, was created in 2015 by Mark Doox (formerly Mark Dukes), an iconographer, and was commissioned by the Rev. Mark Francisco Bozzuti-Jones, an Episcopal priest at Trinity Church in New York City. The icon, created after the shooting of Michael Brown in Ferguson, Missouri, has been referenced as a symbol against gun violence, particularly towards members of the African-American community in the United States.

== History ==
The icon of Our Lady of Ferguson was created in 2015 by Mark Dukes, an iconographer who has written icons for the Episcopal Church and the African Orthodox Church and was commissioned by Rev. Mark Francisco Bozzuti-Jones, an Episcopal priest at Trinity Church in New York City. The icon was painted in the Byzantine style using acrylic paint and collage techniques. Our Lady of Ferguson depicts the Virgin Mary as a Black Madonna, holding her hands up. Where her womb would be located, there is a small black silhouette of the Child Jesus, with the Sacred Heart of Jesus, also with his hands and arms extended, in the crosshairs of a gun. The posture taken by both Jesus and Mary are a reference to "Hands up, don't shoot", a popular slogan associated with protesting police brutality after the Shooting of Michael Brown in Ferguson, Missouri. The position of the hands is also in the orans posture found in other Christian icons. The icon focuses on Marian intercession against police brutality and gun violence, particularly towards people of color.

The icon received publicity after Father James Martin, an American Jesuit priest and author, shared a photograph of the icon on Facebook on June 9, 2016. In his post, Martin wrote "Our Lady prays for all who are targeted by gun violence: African-Americans, the poor and marginalized, and police officers. All are her children. All are our brothers and sisters. Let us ask Our Lady to pray for us".

The icon, used by Anglicans and Catholics, has been displayed at Trinity Church and at the Jesuit School of Theology of Santa Clara University's Gesù Chapel. It is currently on long-term loan to the Cathedral of Saint John the Divine, the mother church of the Episcopal Diocese of New York.
