= Killing of Manuel Ellis =

Homicide of a man while being arrested

- Date: March 3, 2020; 6 years ago
- Location: Tacoma, Washington, U.S.; 47°10′12.7″N 122°27′18.8″W
- Type: Homicide, choking, beating, tasing, police killing
- Deaths: Manuel Ellis
- Accused: Christopher Burbank; Matthew Collins; Timothy Rankine
- Charges: Burbank: Second-degree murder Collins: Second-degree murder Rankine: First-degree manslaughter
- Verdict: All not guilty

Manuel Ellis was a 33-year-old African American man who was killed during an arrest on March 3, 2020, in Tacoma, Washington by the Tacoma Police Department. The Pierce County Sheriff's Department initially claimed that Ellis had attacked a police car and officers, leading to the arrest. State prosecutors quoted civilian witnesses as saying that Ellis did not attack the police car or officers; they also said it was the officers who attacked Ellis after a conversation. Video of the incident showed officers repeatedly punching Ellis, physically restraining him, and using a Taser. State prosecutors stated that "Ellis was not fighting back", citing witness statements and video evidence. A police radio recording showed that Ellis said he "can’t breathe". Ellis told officers "can't breathe, sir" multiple times, according to prosecutors. Ellis was hogtied, face-down, with an officer on him, for at least six minutes, and a spit hood was placed on his head in this position, stated prosecutors. Ellis died at the scene while receiving medical aid from paramedics.

In early June 2020, Ellis's death was ruled by county medical examiner Thomas Clark as a homicide due to "hypoxia due to physical restraint", and with "contributing conditions of methamphetamine intoxication and a dilated heart". Prosecutors, in May 2021 documents, quoted Clark as saying that additional evidence that emerged after the autopsy concluded indicated that "Ellis's death was not likely caused by methamphetamine intoxication", and further indicated that restraint caused the death.

After Ellis's death, four Tacoma police officers were placed on paid administrative leave; they returned to work two weeks later, with the Tacoma police department stating "there were no known departmental violations". The Pierce County Sheriff's Department conducted a three-month investigation into Ellis's death before disclosing that a Pierce County deputy was present during Ellis's arrest. As a result, in mid-June 2020, Governor of Washington Jay Inslee ordered a new investigation by the Washington State Patrol, while the Washington Attorney General would decide potential criminal charges. In May 2021, Washington prosecutors charged two Tacoma police officers, Christopher Burbank and Matthew Collins, with second degree murder for the killing of Ellis, and charged another Tacoma police officer, Timothy Rankine, with first degree manslaughter.

In December 2023, all three defendants were acquitted after being tried for charges ranging from first-degree manslaughter to second-degree murder.

In January 2024, Burbank, Rankine, and Collins each received $500,000 from the Tacoma Police Department plus standard benefits and payouts in exchange for their resignations. As part of the agreement, they were allowed to resign "in good standing."

== Persons involved ==
Manuel Ellis was a 33-year-old African American musician with two children. Ellis's family has said that Ellis struggled with methamphetamine addiction and mental health issues such as depression and schizophrenia. On the night of Ellis's death, he had played drums at his church, Last Day Ministries, then called his mother, brother and sister. After church, Ellis spent time with his landlord and her husband, then walked to a convenience store to buy food.

Three officers were criminally charged with regard to Ellis's death. They are:

- Christopher Burbank, who has been with the Tacoma Police Department since December 2015.
- Matthew Collins, who has been with the Tacoma Police Department since June 2015.
- Timothy Rankine, who has been with the Tacoma Police Department since August 2018.

Other officers, who were involved with Ellis's arrest, but were not criminally charged, were: Tacoma police officer Masyih Ford, Tacoma Police officer Armando Farinas, and Pierce County sheriff's sergeant, Gary Sanders.

== Arrest and death ==
=== Lead-up to arrest ===
The incident started around 11:21 p.m. on March 3, 2020. The arresting officers were not wearing body cameras because the Tacoma Police Department did not use them at the time.

According to state prosecutors in May 2021, on the night of Ellis's death, Tacoma police officers Christopher Burbank and Matthew Collins told other officers that Ellis abruptly and randomly attacked them. Prosecutors cited the other officers saying that Burbank and Collins told them that Ellis first hit their car, then when Burbank and Collins left the car, Ellis attacked them. Burbank and Collins told the other officers that Ellis had used punches and kicks against them, stated prosecutors.

Burbank and Collins were subsequently interviewed by investigators from the Pierce County Sheriff's Department, although the duo later refused to be interviewed by investigators from the Washington State Patrol. The News Tribune reported on transcripts and recordings of Burbank and Collins's interviews, giving the following account. The officers said that when they came across Ellis, he was standing in the middle of the intersection at 96th Street South and Ainsworth Avenue South, where he attempted to open the door of a slowly moving car, but failed (of note, the driver of this car was never found by investigators). The officers said that Ellis approached them while they were in their car, and that he was sweating despite the cold weather. Burbank quoted Ellis saying something similar to: "I'm having a bad day, I need some help and I have warrants". The officers said Ellis threatened to punch Burbank, who then closed the car window, leading to Ellis punching the car window. Collins left the car and Ellis assumed a "fighting stance" towards Collins, so Burbank said that he used his car's "door to actually door check him and hit him with the door to draw his attention away from" Collins, which was supposedly the first instance of physical contact between the men. Collins alleged that Ellis used "superhuman strength" to lift him, throwing Collins into the ground and starting a "wild" fight. According to The Seattle Times, the most significant difference between Burbank and Collins's accounts to sheriff's investigators was that "Burbank did not witness Ellis hoist and throw Collins".

Several of the police statements were "contradicted by the three civilian witnesses, none of whom ever saw Ellis in the intersection, or saw Ellis strike the officers' car, or saw Ellis attack, punch, or otherwise strike the officers at any point", stated the May 2021 charging documents written by Washington prosecutors; in addition, the prosecutors wrote that the "civilian accounts are supported by video sources."

State prosecutors quoted civilian witnesses as giving the following account of the lead-up to Ellis's arrest. Two witnesses said Ellis was walking on a sidewalk and then he approached the officers' car. Witnesses saw Ellis talking to officers in their car in a "peaceful, apparently respectful conversation, with no signs of aggression from Ellis". When Ellis walked away, witnesses saw officer Burbank "abruptly swung open the passenger door of the car, striking Ellis from behind and knocking him to his knees." Then as Ellis tried to get up, Burbank got on top of him, according to the witnesses.

It was 11:21 p.m. at this point.

=== Use of force; initial restraint ===
The next proceeding, according to prosecutors citing video evidence, saw officer Burbank grabbing Ellis, lifting Ellis and driving him down onto the ground while punching him, then officer Collins put his weight on Ellis. Video footage from a female witness shows Ellis being repeatedly punched while on the ground. This was done by officer Collins, stated prosecutors. The female witness calls out to the officers: "Stop. Oh my God, stop hitting him. Just arrest him."

Then, according to prosecutors, officer Collins applied a "lateral vascular neck restraint" to Ellis, which is a type of chokehold. Video footage from a male witness showed that an officer brought Ellis to the ground from behind with a chokehold.

"Ellis was not fighting back", stated the prosecutors, citing witness statements and videos. They quoted one witness as saying that Ellis did not defend himself. The video evidence showed Ellis "struggling at times against the officers’ restraints, but does not show Ellis attempting to strike the officers at any point", stated the prosecutors.

Video footage from the male witness then showed: while Ellis is being choked by one officer, the other officer fires a Taser at Ellis's chest. Prosecutors state that it was Burbank who fired the Taser, and that he did so when Ellis raised his hands in a "surrender-type position" while being choked. Another witness tells officers: "Hey, y'all in the wrong right now".

Next, video footage from the male witness showed that the officer applying the choke then switches to placing a knee on Ellis's back or neck. The male witness who took the video told The Seattle Times that the officer's "knee was right on [Ellis's] neck, on the back of his neck".

After the choke was released by officer Collins, Ellis's head fell limply toward the ground, stated prosecutors. Collins then used his arm to push Ellis's head or neck, resulting in Ellis's face being pushed against the ground, stated prosecutors. The officers pulled Ellis's arms behind his back and pressed down on Ellis's body while they called for backup, stated prosecutors.

While the two officers held Ellis's arms and pressed down on his body, Burbank shocked Ellis again with the Taser, stated prosecutors. Three witnesses leave the scene, while Burbank shocked Ellis with the Taser for a third time.

At 11:23 p.m., Ellis is heard saying "can’t breathe" from a police radio recording. According to prosecutors, a Vivint doorbell camera across the street recorded Ellis clearly saying: "Can't breathe, sir. Can't breathe!" then less than 15 seconds later, Ellis either says "Breathe, sir?" or "Please, sir?" An officer then tells Ellis: "Shut the fuck up, man", according to prosecutors.

Burbank and Collins told county sheriff's investigators that during the incident, Ellis did not speak, only grunting or growling. According to Burbank and/or Collins's interviews with sheriff's investigators, the first Taser shot by Burbank disabled Ellis for five seconds, after which Ellis threw Collins off him. According to Burbank's interview, even after the second Taser shot by Burbank, the situation was akin to Ellis "doing, almost doing push-ups with [Burbank and Collins] on his back". Burbank told sheriff's investigators that he did not notice Ellis struggling to breathe.

=== Backup arrives; further restraint ===
At 11:24 p.m., with Ellis already handcuffed by officers, Tacoma police officer Timothy Rankine responded to the scene as backup. He arrived together with Tacoma police officer Masyih Ford, according to investigation documents. Ford told sheriff's investigators that he held one of Ellis's feet and told Ellis to relax. According to investigation documents, Collins held Ellis's other foot, while Burbank was on Ellis's back, but Ellis allegedly threw Burbank off. Prosecutors described that Rankine got on top of Ellis's back, in a position almost like sitting on Ellis.

After Rankine arrives, Ellis tells the officers: "I can't breathe ... Can't breathe. Can't breathe, sir", stated prosecutors. Officers Rankine and Ford told the county sheriff's investigators that Ellis did say that he could not breathe, contradicting Burbank and Collins's account to county sheriff's investigators that Ellis did not speak. Rankine described Ellis making "really strange animal grunting noises", then described Ellis saying he could not breathe in a "very calm, normal voice", so Rankine replied, "if you’re talking to me, you can breathe just fine", stated prosecutors.

According to investigation documents, Burbank retrieved a hobble to use on Ellis, while Tacoma Police Sergeant Michael Lim, Pierce County Sheriff's Lieutenant Anthony Messineo, and Pierce County Sheriff's Sergeant Gary Sanders arrived on the scene. According to investigation documents, Sanders helped to place the hobble on Ellis. Sanders told State Patrol investigators that he pulled Ellis's foot to Ellis's waist, placing it into the hobble, resulting in Ellis being "pretty much contained at that point. Thus, Ellis's legs were tied together with a nylon strap that was connected to the handcuffs on Ellis, leaving Ellis face-down in a hogtied position, stated prosecutors.

Lieutenant Anthony Messineo told investigators that after Ellis was hobbled, Ellis did not move; Messineo heard "agonal breathing" from Ellis akin to "last breaths" when "someone is dying", stated prosecutors.

The officers briefly rolled Ellis onto his side, where Rankine observed Ellis having a high temperature, sweating copiously, and bleeding from his face, stated prosecutors. Then, Rankine rolled Ellis back onto his stomach; Rankine also used his knees to apply pressure on Ellis, stated prosecutors. Rankine claimed that Ellis was violently thrashing around, so Rankine left a knee on Ellis's back, but Lieutenant Messineo and Sergeant Sanders contradicted Rankine's claim, stating that Ellis had stopped moving by that point, stated prosecutors. Messineo told other officers at the scene that Ellis showed signs of excited delirium, stated prosecutors.

At 11:25 p.m., Sergeant Lim called for the Tacoma Fire Department to "check [Ellis] out", stated prosecutors. By then, Burbank, Collins and Rankine had not called for medical aid, and they did not tell the dispatcher that Ellis said he could not breathe, that Ellis was experiencing agonal breathing, and that Ellis was possibly in excited delirium, stated prosecutors. At 11:27 p.m., Lim called for an ambulance, while stating that Ellis would need to be "strapped down", stated prosecutors. At 11:32 p.m., Lim requested "priority" medical aid for Ellis.

Meanwhile, for at least six minutes, until the Tacoma Fire Department arrived, Ellis was hogtied and face-down while officer Rankine applied pressure to Ellis's back, stated prosecutors. While in this position, a spit hood was put on Ellis's head by an officer around 11:27 p.m, despite the brand of the spit hood warning that such an item should not be used on a person who is "having difficulty breathing", stated prosecutors. The officer who placed the spit hood on Ellis was Armando Farinas of the Tacoma police, stated State Patrol investigation findings published in December 2020. Officers Burbank, Collins and Rankine had "heard Ellis repeatedly plead that he could not breathe", but did not stop the spit hood from being placed on Ellis, and also did not remove the spit hood from Ellis's head, stated prosecutors.

In total, 20 officers responded as backup to the scene. Other Pierce County Sheriff's Department officers performed road traffic control duties.

=== Medical attention; death ===
Members of the Tacoma Fire Department arrived at the scene at 11:34 p.m. According to prosecutors, a paramedic saw that Ellis was not conscious and unresponsive, with his breathing deteriorating, his heartbeat weak, and his pupils were fixed and dilated, the latter sign possibly indicating that Ellis was brain dead.

According to prosecutors, Rankine was asked by paramedics to remove Ellis's restraints so that they could begin intravenous therapy, but Rankine refused at first. Rankine told county sheriff's investigators that he did not want to remove Ellis's "cuffs in case as he starts fighting again". When paramedics insisted, Rankine acquiesced and removed Ellis's restraints, and paramedics tended to Ellis, stated prosecutors.

Around 11:35 p.m., Ellis stopped breathing. Paramedics unsuccessfully attempted resuscitation for almost 40 minutes, including CPR and inserting a tube down his throat; Ellis was pronounced dead at the scene at 12:12 a.m.

Later that night, the officers involved had their injuries photographed. Collins had scrapes on his elbows and knees, and he later said that his right knee swelled. Burbank had a minor abrasion on one knee. Rankine and Ford were not injured.

== Investigations ==
=== County sheriff's investigations ===
The Pierce County Sheriff's Department handled the immediate investigation into Ellis's death. By March 5, the Pierce County Sheriff's Department claimed that the arrest was caused by Ellis running up to a police patrol car and hitting it, then "as the officers exited their vehicle, they were immediately attacked by" Ellis, described Pierce County Sheriff's Department spokesman Ed Troyer. Also by March 5, officials also said at that time that Ellis appeared to be in a state of excited delirium. Although the Pierce County Sheriff's Department wanted to interview the involved officers on the night of Ellis's death, the officers' police union delayed the interviews until March 6 to March 9.

The Pierce County Sheriff's Department privately identified four Tacoma police officers as being involved in Ellis's death: Christopher Burbank, Matthew Collins, Timothy Rankine and Masyih Ford. The four were initially placed on paid administrative leave, but returned to work after two weeks as "there were no known departmental violations", stated the Tacoma police department. In the week of June 1, 2020, the Tacoma Police Department revealed the identities of the above four officers to the public as those officers involved in the arrest.

By June 4, 2020, police said that before Ellis had hit the police car, he had harassed a woman at the intersection of 96th Street South and Ainsworth Avenue, hitting her car window, and tried to open doors of occupied vehicles. Troyer said on June 4 that Ellis had "picked up [an] officer by his vest and slam-dunked him on the ground", "never tried to run, he engaged with the officers and started a fight". The Guardian reported on June 4 that Troyer denied that chokeholds were used during the arrest. Video footage that emerged later showed that Ellis was choked. Also on June 4, Troyer also said that officers "didn't use a Taser" on Ellis, but video footage that emerged later showed they did.

The News Tribune reported on June 4 that the Pierce County Sheriff's Department was still trying to find three motorists who were at the scene of Ellis's arrest, despite the sheriff's department impending end of the investigation being within a week's time. The sheriff's department had searched the neighborhood and checked records, but could not find the vehicles or its passengers.

When video of Ellis's arrest, taken by a female witness, was posted online on June 4, the Pierce County Sheriff's Department said that this was the first time they had learned of the video, and that they were looking to speak with the witness.

KING 5 reported on June 4 or June 5 that Pierce County Sheriff's Department spokesman Ed Troyer said: "Our guys did a thorough job of investigating this". On June 9, Troyer said that the department would accept an independent investigation: "If there’s any reason there’s a conflict, we would bow out."

On June 10, 2020, Pierce County prosecutor Mary Robnett released a statement that on June 9, the Pierce County Sheriff informed her that a Pierce County Sheriff's "deputy was on scene at some point during the detention of Manuel Ellis". This piece of information had not been revealed to the public throughout the three months of investigations by the Pierce County Sheriff's Department. Citing this possible conflict of interest for the Pierce County Sheriff's Department, Robnett requested state investigators "investigate and review this case".

=== Initial medical examiner ruling ===
On June 2, 2020, the Pierce County medical examiner's office ruled that Ellis's death was a homicide. The death was certified as being caused by "hypoxia due to physical restraint", and with "contributing conditions of methamphetamine intoxication and a dilated heart". It was also ruled that it was "unlikely that this death would have occurred due to physical restraint alone without the contributing conditions". Hypoxia refers to inadequate oxygen supply, which in this case was caused by "physical restraint, positioning, and the placement of a mask over the mouth" (in this case, a spit hood). The Pierce County medical examiner stated that Ellis had enough methamphetamine in his system to be fatal, and that "an argument could be made" that methamphetamine intoxication "should be considered the primary factor", but also stated that Ellis had a normal heartbeat when paramedics first found him, while he was close to respiratory arrest. Some of Ellis's chest injuries were "consistent with Taser probes", quoted KING 5 from the medical examiner's report.

On June 3, 2020, the officers were again placed on administrative leave.

=== Release of videos ===
On June 4, 2020, the Tacoma Action Collective racial justice organization posted on Twitter around one minute of video footage of Ellis's arrest, consisting of two video clips taken by a female witness. On June 9, over eight minutes of security camera footage were released to the public by the Tacoma Action Collective. On June 14, 2020, another witness video, with almost one minute of footage, was released to the public by a lawyer for Ellis's family.

=== State investigations ===
On June 10, 2020, Governor of Washington Jay Inslee said that due to the presence of Pierce County Sheriff's department officers at the scene of Ellis's death, he did not want the Pierce County Sheriff's department to complete the investigation, and he also did not want the Pierce County prosecutor to make charging decisions. On June 17, Inslee ordered the Washington State Patrol to launch a new investigation into Ellis' death, while the Washington State Attorney General would decide if criminal charges were warranted. Officers Christopher Burbank, Matthew Collins, Timothy Rankine and Masyih Ford all refused to be interviewed or questioned by State Patrol investigators.

In June 2020, Inslee's office acknowledged that a Washington State Patrol trooper arrived on the scene after Ellis was handcuffed, and stayed there briefly. Inslee's office described that trooper's involvement as "limited", stating that this trooper had been questioned by the Washington State Patrol and the Washington State Attorney General's Office. Inslee's office further said that the State Patrol "will exclude [that trooper] and others from the area from any part of the investigation."

In November 2020, the State Patrol passed their 2,169-page findings to the Washington State Attorney General's Office. In December 2020, it was revealed from the State Patrol findings that officer Armando Farinas was also involved in Ellis's arrest, by placing a spit hood on Ellis's head. Farinas had also refused to be interviewed or questioned by State Patrol investigators. The State Patrol findings also named the Pierce County Sheriff's Department deputy who helped to restrain Ellis as Sergeant Gary Sanders, who was off-duty when he responded to the arrest. Sanders was not suspended for his role in Ellis's arrest, stated the county sheriff's department.

The Washington State Attorney General's Office also conducted its own investigations into Ellis's death.

==== Later medical examiner comments ====
After the Washington State Patrol's investigation findings were released in December 2020, The News Tribune reported that an investigator's notes quoting Dr. Thomas Clark, the Pierce County medical examiner at the time of Ellis's death, as saying: “the details of restraint weren't clear at time of autopsy and keep changing"; "this is problematic."

In May 2021, in charging documents, the Washington attorney general's office provided additional statements from Clark. The documents stated that Clark received more evidence only after the autopsy concluded, such as heart monitor readings and learning about an officer putting their weight on Ellis's back. Clark now concluded that "Ellis's death was not likely caused by methamphetamine intoxication", with his slow heart rate and "conditions consistent with pulseless electrical activity" not indicating death from methamphetamine intoxication, according to the documents. The attorney general's office also quoted Clark as saying that since Ellis's death was not sudden, but "gradual", this indicated that restraint caused the death.

== Charges ==
On May 27, 2021, the Washington State Attorney General's Office, using evidence from its own investigation and the State Patrol investigation, charged officers Christopher Burbank and Matthew Collins with second-degree murder, and charged officer Timothy Rankine with first-degree manslaughter. Burbank and Collins's charge pertains to whether they caused Ellis's death while committing assault or unlawful imprisonment; Rankine's charge pertains to whether he recklessly caused Ellis's death. This was the first instance of the Washington Attorney General's Office charging police officers in regard to illegal use of deadly force. The three officers were taken into custody that day. The officers continued to receive salary in spite of the charges.

The next day, the trio left jail after making bail at $100,000 each. A Tacoma construction company owner said he posted the officers' bail, despite not knowing the officers; he expressed a belief that the officers "were doing their job" and would be acquitted in the trial.

== Criminal trial ==
The trial of the three officers began in September 2023 and concluded in December. During closing arguments, lawyers representing Burbank created controversy by claiming that Ellis "created his own death" through excessive drug use.

On December 21, 2023, a jury found Burbank, Collins, and Rankine not guilty on all charges.

== Civil cases ==
In 2023, Pierce County settled a federal wrongful-death suit by Ellis's family for $4 million. In July 2025, the City of Tacoma settled a similar suit for $6 million.

== Resignation ==
In the wake of the acquittal, all three of the officers agreed to resign "in good standing" from the Tacoma Police Department in exchange for a payment of $500,000 each. This was in addition to a roughly equal sum they had received during their period of suspension from the force.

== Reactions ==
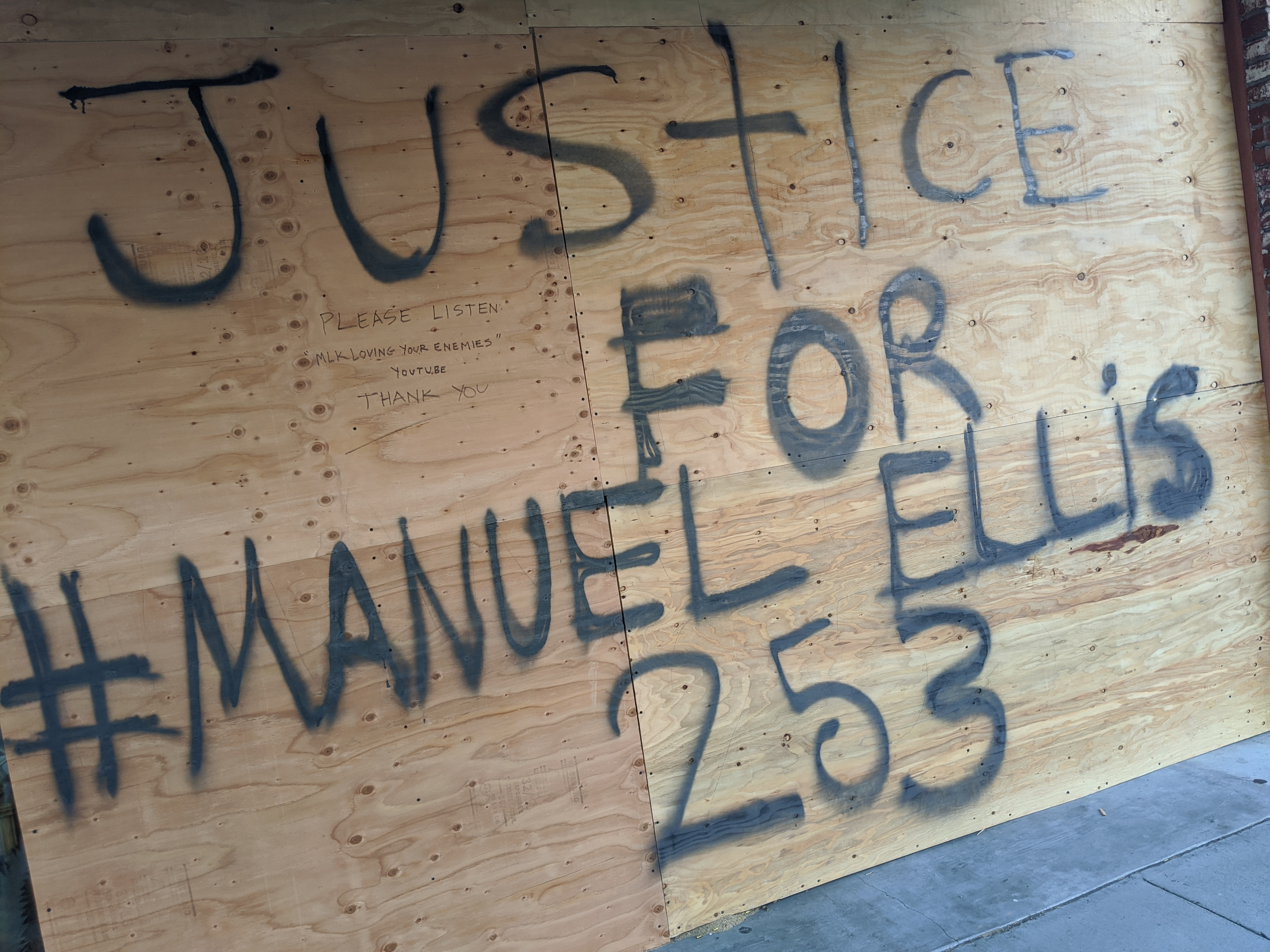
Boarded up shop window at a George Floyd protest in Burbank, California, June 4, 2020

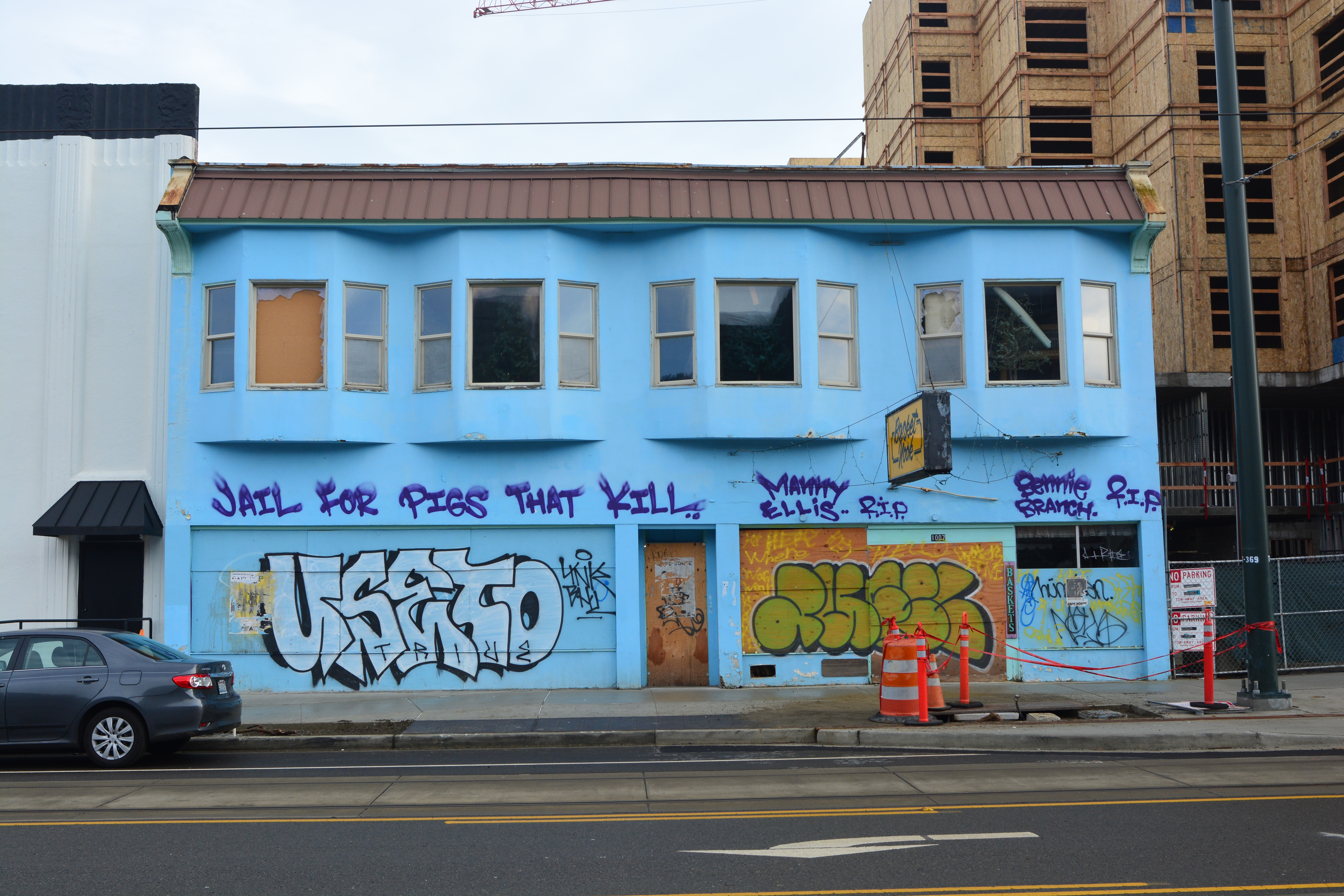
Graffiti on a boarded-up building in Tacoma's Hilltop neighborhood: "Jail for pigs that kill. Manny Ellis R.I.P. Bennie Branch R.I.P." January 22, 2024

=== 2020 ===
In March 2020, Ellis's sister expressed doubts in relation to Ellis's death, stating that Ellis "wouldn’t hurt anyone".

In late May 2020, Ellis's sister and the Black Lives Matter Seattle / King County organization created a GoFundMe crowdfunding effort in relation to Ellis's death.

A vigil was held for Ellis in Tacoma on June 3. Just before the vigil, Ellis' brother said: "We just want answers. We want justice. We want [Ellis's] truth to come to light".

After learning that Ellis had died due to police restraint, Governor Inslee on June 3 called for an investigation that was "complete" and "not tainted", while also advocating for a continued "push for de-escalation interactions between law enforcement and our community members."

On June 4, after the release of the first witness videos, Tacoma mayor Victoria Woodards said that "the officers who committed this crime should be fired and prosecuted". The next day, the Tacoma City Council decided to call for an independent review of Ellis's death.

The Tacoma Police Union on June 4 objected to the mayor's call to fire and prosecute the officers, stating that she had done so "with less than a minute of short, blurry, partial Twitter videos in hand", "without an ounce of evidence to support her words". The Tacoma Police Union said that the investigation would show that the arresting officers "did no wrong", while the Tacoma Police Management Association said that the mayor had given "an angry theatrical reaction".

There were protests in Tacoma on June 5 over Ellis's death. There were further protests on June 18, with "Black Lives Matter" chants.

On June 5, a female witness who recorded part of the arrest before leaving, spoke to The New York Times. She disputed the Pierce County Sheriff's Department's account of Ellis's death, stating that police started the confrontation, not Ellis. She said she "was terrified for his life ... The way that they attacked him didn’t make sense to me. I went home and was sick to my stomach." She further said that she did not know that Ellis died during the arrest until the week of this interview.

Lawyers for the officers said that during the arrest: "No one choked Mr. Ellis, not for 8 minutes and 45 seconds, not at all". Video footage that emerged later showed that Ellis was choked.

In mid-June 2020, KIRO 7 reported that Michael Staropoli, a lawyer for Tacoma police officers Matthew Collins and Masyih Ford, said that a state-run investigation into the incident would be "fantastic": "We not only welcome that, we embrace it." Staropoli also called for the public to wait for "the full story to come out".

Washington Attorney General Bob Ferguson said that it was "disturbing that the Pierce County sheriff's office" only revealed its involvement in Ellis's arrest "after more than three months". Ferguson called for the sheriff's office to "answer for its failure to comply with" Initiative 940, which was a state law that went into effect in January 2020, approved by voters in Washington, that required for independent investigations into police killings to avoid conflicts of interest.

In August 2020, The Seattle Times reported a male witness who recorded part of the arrest as saying that the arrest was "police brutality". He accused police of "a human rights violation" for kneeling on Ellis's neck. In September 2020, The Seattle Times reported the same male witness as saying that the Tacoma Police Department and the Pierce County Sheriff's Department's account of the arrest was different from what he saw. The police had said that Ellis initiated the conflict, but the male witness "couldn’t believe it's the same guy" he saw. The male witness concluded that "one story was false".

=== 2021 ===
After the three Tacoma police officers were charged in May 2021, the Tacoma Police Union claimed that the charges were a "witch hunt", that the officers "acted in accordance with the law", and "like every community member, our officers are presumed innocent until proven guilty."

== See also ==
- List of unarmed African Americans killed by law enforcement officers in the United States
- 2020–2021 United States racial unrest
- Human rights in the United States
- Lists of killings by law enforcement officers in the United States
- Police brutality in the United States
- I can't breathe, phrase uttered by several African American men before being killed by police
- Killing of Daniel Prude
