= I can't breathe =

Human rights slogan

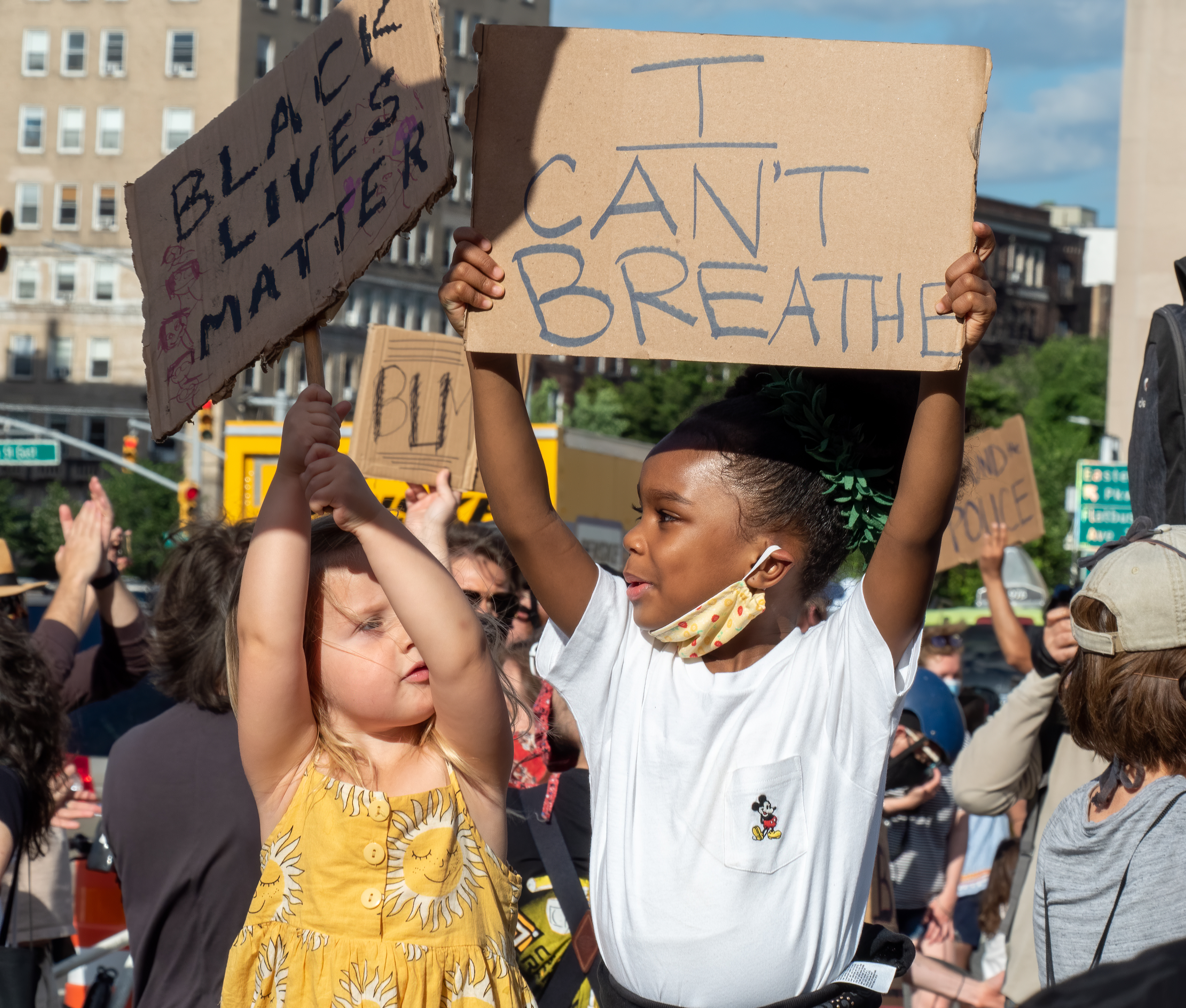
- George Floyd protest in 2020
- Origin: Killing of Eric Garner
- Context: Police brutality and lack of police accountability
- Meaning: Rallying cry against police brutality

"I can't breathe" is a slogan of the Black Lives Matter movement in the United States. The phrase originates from the last words of Eric Garner, who was killed in 2014 after being put in a chokehold by a New York City police officer. A number of other Black Americans, such as Javier Ambler, Elijah McClain, Manuel Ellis, and George Floyd, have said the same phrase prior to dying during similar law-enforcement encounters. According to a 2020 report by The New York Times, the phrase has been used by over 70 people who died in police custody. The phrase is now used in widespread protest against police brutality and racial inequality in the United States.

== Eric Garner ==
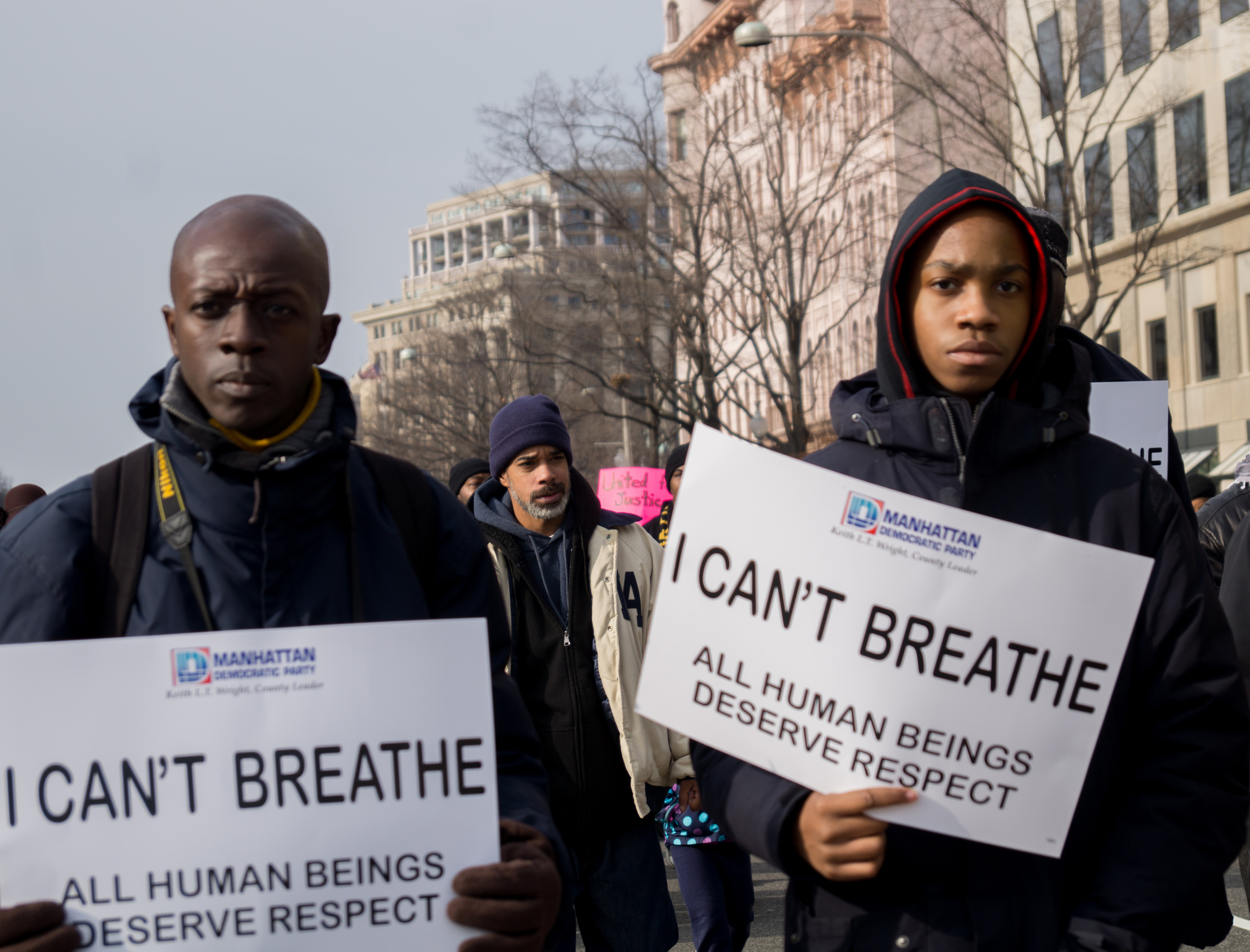
Justice for All March/National March Against Police Violence, Washington, D.C., December 2014

The phrase originated on July 17, 2014, during the death of Eric Garner, who was put into a chokehold by Daniel Pantaleo, a New York City Police Department officer. A video of Garner restrained by multiple officers which showed him saying "I can't breathe" 11 times before losing consciousness and dying was widely circulated. When it was announced on December 3 that after considering the case for two months the grand jury had decided not to indict Officer Pantaleo, protests erupted with Garner's last words, "I can't breathe" used as a slogan and as a chant.

Fred Shapiro, editor of The Yale Book of Quotations, relates that he had already finished his 2014 list of most notable quotes and sent it out to the media on Dec 3, the same day that the grand jury decided to not indict Pantaleo for the death of Garner. Shapiro states that as he watched the news coverage with protesters turning Garner's final words into a rallying cry, within an hour he revised his list, making "I can't breathe" the top quote of the year. He expressed that it was not a slogan of only that moment, but "a phrase with real and lasting impact". Shapiro said that it was the first time he had ever revised a list.

=== Expressions of solidarity ===
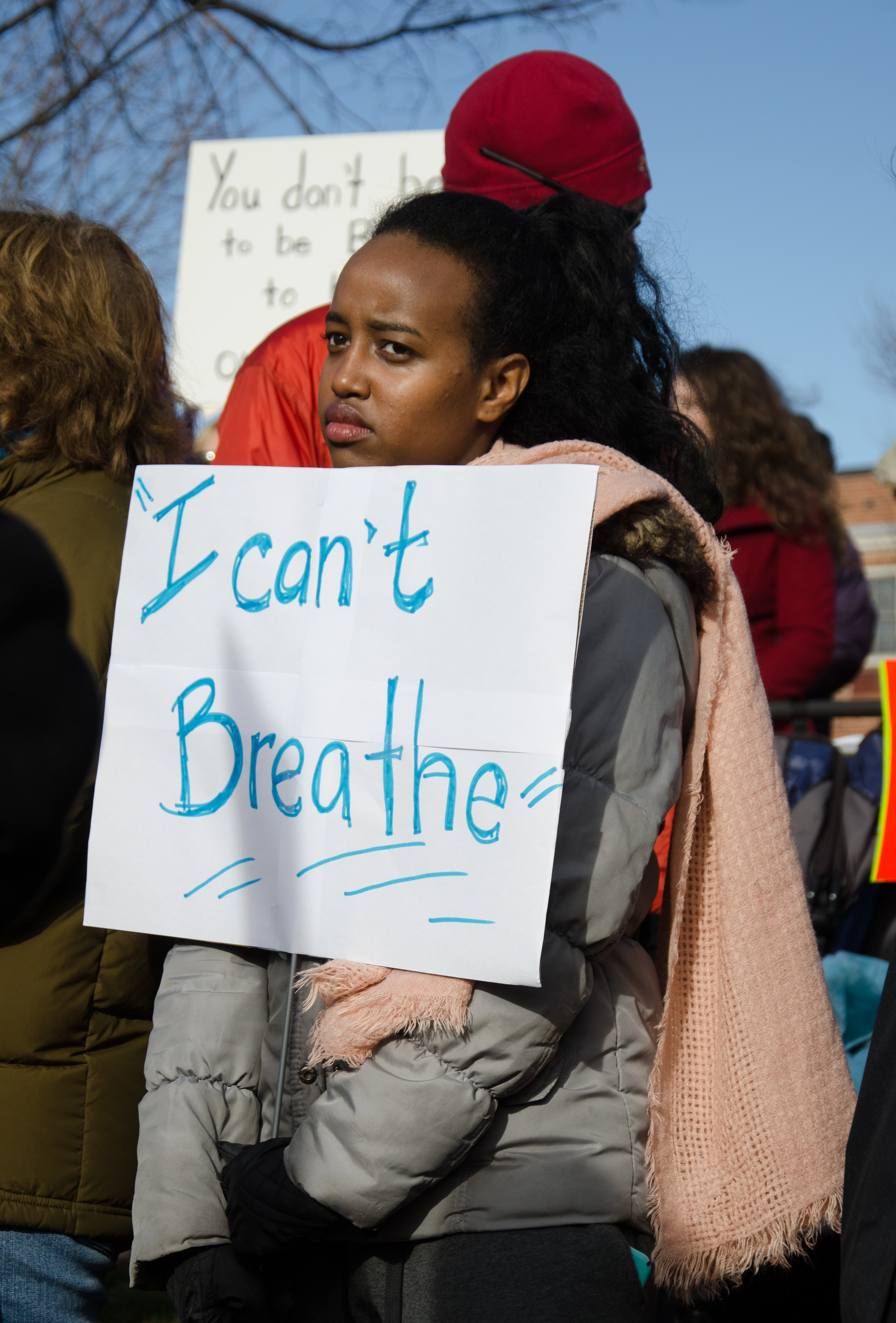
A protester in Berlin, Massachusetts, December 2014

Aided by expressions of solidarity from amateur and professional athletes and others, the hashtag "#ICantBreathe" was tweeted over 1.3 million times during December 2014.

==== Athletes ====
The first display from athletes was when the Notre Dame Fighting Irish women's basketball team wore T-shirts emblazoned with "I can't breathe" during a December 13 game warm-up. Athletes from both the National Football League and the National Basketball Association, notably LeBron James, wore clothing printed with "I can't breathe." Following criticism of James, President Barack Obama came to his defense, stating "I think LeBron did the right thing... We forget the role that Muhammad Ali, Arthur Ashe and Bill Russell played in raising consciousness." In late December, officials from the Fort Bragg Unified School District in Mendocino County, California banned athletes from wearing "I can't breathe" T-shirts before a three-day high school basketball tournament, before reversing the ban. The American Civil Liberties Union wrote a letter in support of the students.

==== Academics ====
Linguist Ben Zimmer compared it to similar slogans such as "Hands up, don't shoot," which originated in the 2014 shooting of Michael Brown, and the older "No justice, no peace." Zimmer called it "a peculiarly powerful rallying cry," and noted, "to intone the words 'I can't breathe,' surrounded by thousands of others doing the same, is an act of intense empathy and solidarity. The empathy comes from momentarily stepping into the persona of Eric Garner at that instant the life was being choked out of him." Zimmer noted that, in the variant "We can't breathe," the phrase becomes directed towards social change and more metaphorical. Phrases seen on protests signs such as "Justice can't breathe" and "Our democracy can't breathe" extend the meaning beyond the physical circumstances of Garner's death.

Joshua D. Rothman of the University of Alabama noted that fashion statements such as the "I can't breathe" T-shirts are "easily and often dismissed by opponents as a cheap gesture or a stunt." However, analyzing the fashion craze in the late 18th and early 19th century for the "Am I Not a Man and a Brother?" cameos made by Josiah Wedgwood for bracelets and hair ornaments, and subsequent incorporation of the kneeling slave image into many different types of products as the most widely used symbol of the American abolitionist movement, Rothman asserted that "we ought not underestimate fashion's value and significance for building momentum and visibility for a political cause."

==== Others ====
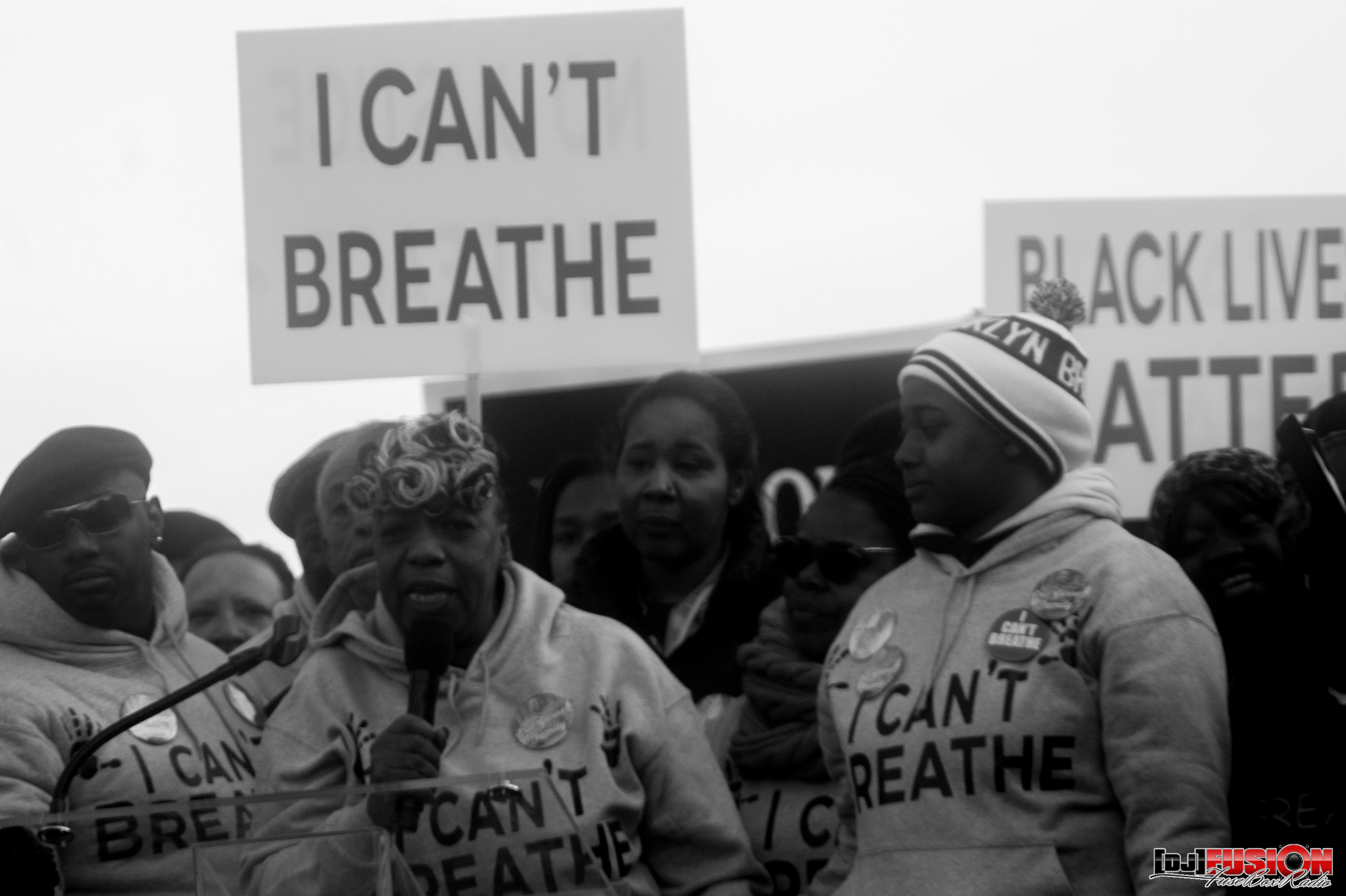
Speakers at a December 2014 march in Washington, D.C.

The cast of the movie Selma wore "I can't breathe" shirts to their December premiere. Actor David Oyelowo recounts that members of the Academy of Motion Picture Arts and Sciences complained to movie producers and stated that in retaliation they would not vote for Selma to receive Oscars. Oyelowo states, "It's part of why that film didn't get everything that people think it should've got and it birthed #OscarsSoWhite."

Professor Grace Ji-Sun Kim and Reverend Jesse Jackson wrote in a December 2014 opinion piece that the phrase "has become a slogan for the people who have taken to social media and the streets to protest the killing of unarmed African Americans, challenging a system that fails to indict and calling for greater equality."

The phrase has been frequently invoked in protest songs and other music. Eric Garner's siblings released the song "I Can't Breathe" in 2016. The first English song by Russian band Pussy Riot was entitled "I Can't Breathe". Songwriter H.E.R. released a song by the same name in 2020.

=== Counter-reaction ===
Supporters of the New York City Police Department marched on December 19, 2014, in black hoodies emblazoned with "I can breathe, thanks to the NYPD" and shouted "Don't resist arrest!" at counter-protesters. Separately, shirts produced and sold online by Jason Barthel, a police officer in Mishawaka, Indiana, that stated, "Breathe Easy: Don't break the law" drew criticism. Barthel stated, "When you break the law, unfortunately there's going to be consequences, and some of them aren't going to be pretty." Members of the city council of South Bend, Indiana asked then-mayor and future-U.S. presidential candidate Pete Buttigieg for cooperation in banning the city from future contracts with Barthel's uniform business. Buttigieg's political opponent Henry Davis Jr. described the response: "He refused to touch it. And when he touched it, he agreed with both sides."

== Javier Ambler II ==
On March 28, 2019, Javier Ambler II died while being arrested in Austin, Texas. Ambler was arrested and tased after fleeing from deputies who sought to stop him for a traffic violation and leading them on a 22-minute car chase which ended in a crash. His final words were "I can't breathe." Ambler's death was ruled a homicide, caused by congestive heart failure and hypertensive cardiovascular disease in combination with forcible restraint.

== Manuel Ellis ==
Manuel Ellis died on March 3, 2020, during an arrest by police officers in Tacoma, Washington. Ellis pleaded "I can't breathe" with officers before dying in the minutes after his arrest. A witness contradicted earlier police accounts of his arrest and death. The video showed police punching Ellis during the arrest. The Pierce County medical examiner ruled that Ellis's death was a homicide, resulting from hypoxia due to physical restraint. The medical examiner said other factors contributed to Ellis's death, including methamphetamine intoxication, heart disease and a mask officers had placed over his mouth meant to stop spitting or biting.

== George Floyd ==
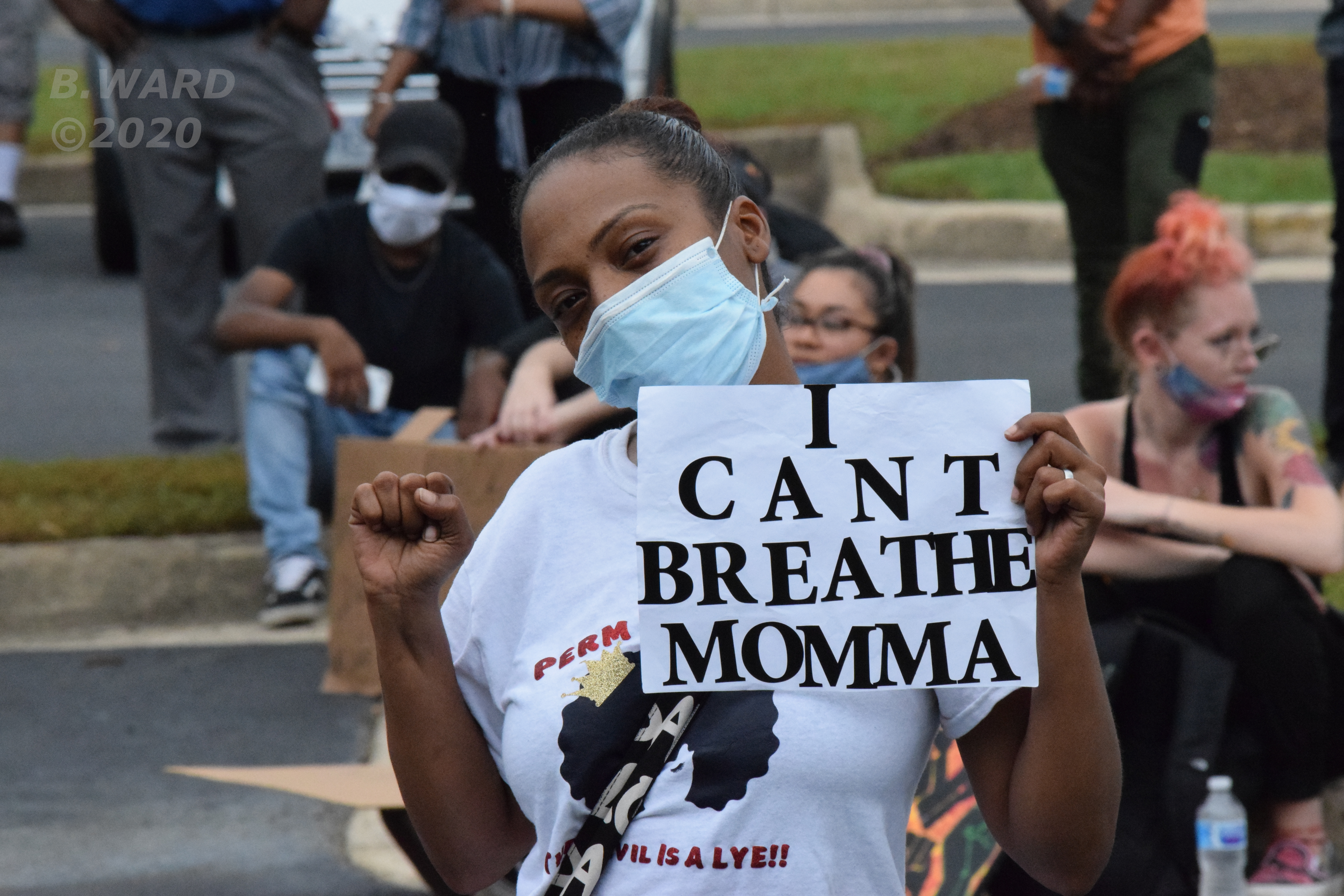
A protester holds a sign saying "I Can't Breathe Momma", at a Black Lives Matter Rally in Dumfries, Virginia. "I can't breathe momma" was one of the phrases said by George Floyd while he was being murdered.

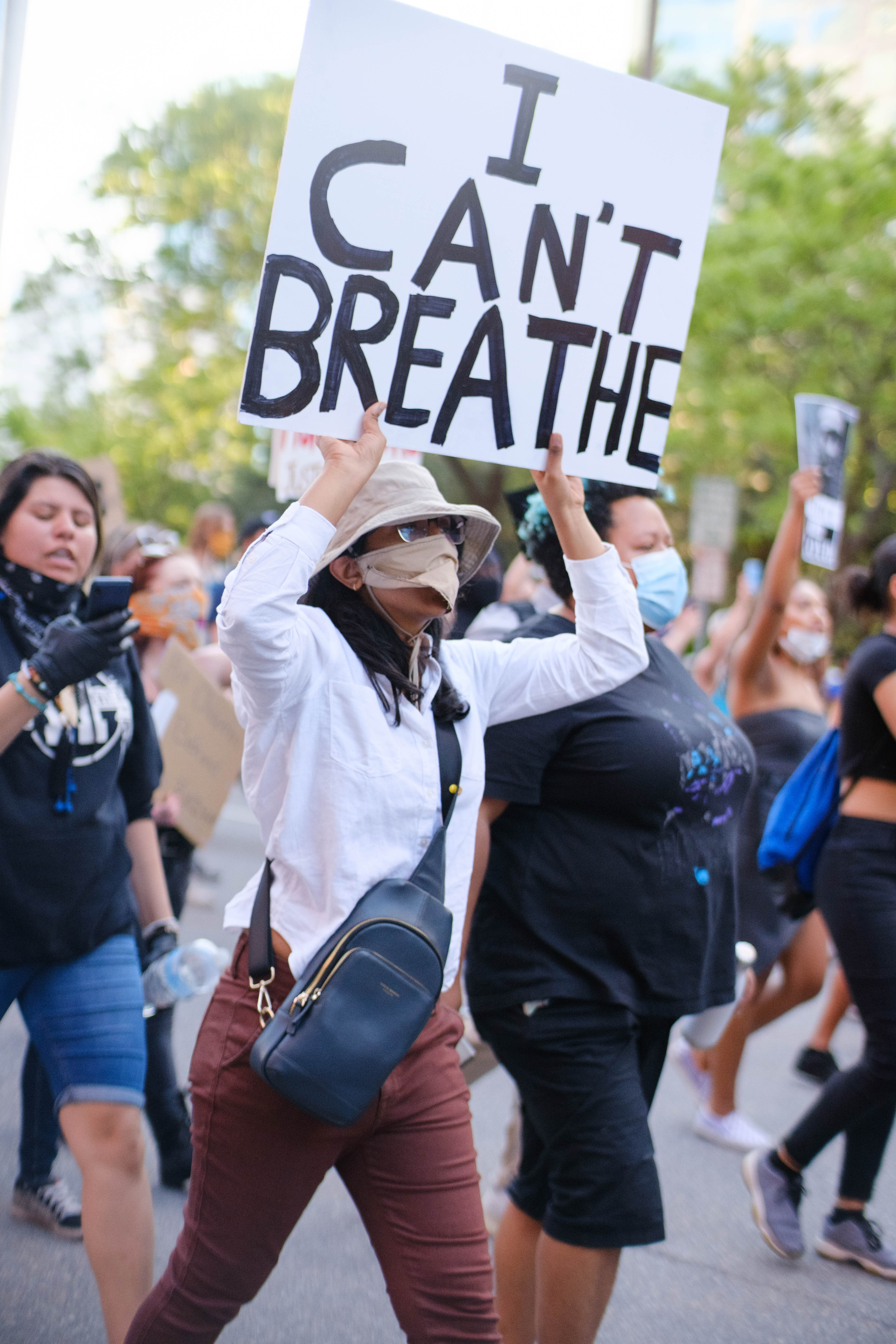
A protester in Minneapolis, May 28, 2020

On May 25, 2020, Minneapolis Police Department officer Derek Chauvin murdered George Floyd by kneeling on the back of his neck for about ten minutes. Police body camera video showed that Floyd said that he couldn't breathe before he was on the ground and under Chauvin's knee. Spectator video of the incident showed Floyd saying "I can't breathe" multiple times while he was under Chauvin's knee. Despite his pleas, as well as a bystander exclaiming that the officer was preventing Floyd from breathing, Chauvin continued the restraint for 2 minutes and 53 seconds after Floyd became unresponsive, while three other officers watched. All four officers were subsequently dismissed from the police force, with Chauvin being convicted of second-degree murder, third-degree murder, and second-degree manslaughter, while the three others were convicted of aiding and abetting manslaughter.

"I can't breathe" became a rallying cry for the subsequent nationwide protests. Protesters have adopted it as a chant. In his first public speech on George Floyd's murder and protests on June 2, presidential candidate Joe Biden began with, "I can't breathe. I can't breathe. George Floyd's last words. But they didn't die with him. They're still being heard. They're echoing across this nation." That same day, ViacomCBS-owned networks paused their programming to show a black screen for 8 minutes and 46 seconds with the words "I can't breathe" displayed (for Nickelodeon networks, it was interrupted by an orange screen with a scrolling message about the Declaration of Kids' Rights).

At the site of his murder, artists painted a mural memorializing Floyd, but deliberately used the words, "I can breathe now", to promote community healing and reclaim a sense of power. After Chauvin's conviction, the Las Vegas Raiders of the National Football League tweeted "I CAN BREATHE". Raiders owner Mark Davis, who said the post was his idea, stated that he "took the lead" from Floyd's brother, who after the verdict said: "Today, we are able to breathe again". Afterwards, Davis said that he would not have used the phrase if he had known it was used by police supporters after Eric Garner's death.

=== Counter-reaction ===
On June 24, 2020, Councilman Guy Phillips of Scottsdale, Arizona City, said, "I can't breathe", as he took off his mask at a rally protesting the mandatory mask wearing announced by Scottsdale Mayor Jim Lane during the COVID-19 pandemic in Arizona. He was condemned by local and state officials. Arizona Senator Martha McSally stated, "Despicable. This is a serious moment in history and it's disgusting you are mocking the dying words of a murdered man." Governor Doug Ducey said, "Just flat out wrong. Despicable doesn't go far enough. The final words of George Floyd should never be invoked like this. Anyone who mocks the murder of a fellow human has no place in public office. Period." Phillips later issued an apology.

Anti-mask protesters have reappropriated the phrase to signal their opposition to mask requirements during the COVID-19 pandemic. During the 2021 storming of the United States Capitol, protesters attempting to enter into the Capitol through a police line chanted "I can't breathe".

== Other victims ==
- David Dungay Jr., an Australian Aboriginal Dunghutti man, was killed in Long Bay Correctional Centre, Sydney in 2015. Dungay had biscuits and began eating them, and refused or ignored orders to stop. Prison guards entered his cell and compressed his body, while he was on the ground. He repeatedly yelled "I can't breathe!" but this was ignored by prison guards who said "If you can talk, you can breathe." A nurse injected Dungay with midazolam, a sedative which further depressed his breathing. Dungay died shortly after, still with prison guards on top of him. The incident was caught on camera. No criminal charges were laid, and none of the guards involved faced any disciplinary action. In the aftermath of Floyd's death, Dungay's family members sent their support to Floyd's family and the Black Lives Matter movement, while also observing that Floyd had become better known in Australia than Dungay and that Australians needed to extend their support of black lives to include Indigenous Australians.
- Following the 2021 conviction of Derek Chauvin for the murder of George Floyd, the DOJ began looking into a 2017 incident discovered by the state prosecution team while doing research for the Chauvin trial. It involved an incident in which Chauvin and another officer were dispatched to a home where a woman claimed she had been attacked by her son and young daughter. Upon arriving, when the boy, fourteen years old at the time, refused to follow the command to lie down on the floor Chauvin hit him with his flashlight so hard that he needed stitches. Then Chauvin allegedly held him down for nearly 17 minutes, ignoring complaints from the boy that he couldn't breathe. According to an account of the incident, after hitting the boy with his flashlight, he grabbed his throat, hit him again, and then "applied a neck restraint, causing the child to lose consciousness and go to the ground." Chauvin and the other officer then placed the boy in a prone position and handcuffed him. According to the account, "the mother pleaded with them not to kill her son."
- Christopher Lowe died while handcuffed in the back of a police cruiser in Fort Worth, Texas, on July 26, 2018. When Lowe told officers he was dying and could not breathe, officers told him "Don't pull that shit," berated him, threatened to pepper spray him, and conspired not to tell medical staff about his medical condition, according to disciplinary letters issued against the officers. Five of the officers were fired while two were suspended without pay. Six officers have appealed; one waived his right to appeal and accepted the suspension in lieu of termination.
- Derrick Scott died in Oklahoma City on May 20, 2019, after being restrained by officers for about 13 minutes. Police were responding to a call about someone brandishing a gun. Scott fled when confronted by police and a gun was removed by an officer during the arrest. One officer put her knee between Scott's shoulder blades and a second straddled Scott's back. When Scott told officers multiple times that he couldn't breathe, one officer responded, "I don't care," and another said, "You can breathe just fine." Scott died at the hospital an hour later due to a collapsed lung, according to an autopsy that found physical restraint, recent methamphetamine use, asthma, bullous emphysema and atherosclerotic heart disease contributed to Scott's death. Following an investigation that cleared the officers of wrongdoing, Oklahoma County District Attorney David Prater told the press, "I mean, he's just a perfect candidate to die when you've got meth in your system and those kinds of physical ailments and then you fight with police. [The officers] didn't do anything wrong at all."
- Byron Williams died in police custody in Las Vegas on September 5, 2019, saying, "I can't breathe." Williams had been flagged down by Las Vegas Metro Police officers after they spotted him riding his bike without a safety light just before sunrise at 5:48 a.m. He fled officers and abandoned his bike and then scaled two walls before being arrested 1 minute and 40 seconds after the start of the encounter. According to police, he resisted by refusing to give up on his arms and that he had drugs on him which he tried to conceal. He was arrested and according to the police video, Williams was held down while on his stomach, he said "I can't breathe" at least 17 times before he eventually lost consciousness. At the end of the pursuit, five officers had arrived at the scene to assist in the arrest. Paramedics arrived 14 minutes after Williams lost consciousness and he was later declared dead at the hospital. Las Vegas police released only some of the bodycam video to the public. None of the officers involved has been charged. The incident is one of several police custody deaths that re-emerged following the murder of George Floyd.
- John Elliott Neville died in Winston-Salem, North Carolina, on December 4, 2019, after being restrained in the Forsyth County jail. During a medical emergency, he was behaving erratically. He said, "I can't breathe" at least 28 times, as well as "Help me", "Let me go" and "Mama". While he was in bent-leg prone restraint, a technique discouraged in 1995 by the National Law Enforcement Technology Center, jail staff had difficulty removing his handcuffs. Neville had no pulse and CPR was used, but after being hospitalized he died December 4. Five jailers and a nurse were charged. As of July 24, protests had continued for two weeks. Video of the incident was released after news outlets demanded it. Triad Abolition Project and others occupied Bailey Park for 49 days until Forsyth County Sheriff Bobby Kimbrough Jr. announced a ban on bent-leg prone restraint. Neville's son Sean Neville filed a wrongful death suit in U.S. Federal Court September 29, 2021. The suit named as defendants the five officers, Wellpath LLC, Kimbrough, and Forsyth County. In court papers filed November 23, 2021, Wellpath denied the nurse violated any policies. In April 2022 a grand jury indicted the nurse but not the officers. Court documents filed May 25, 2022 show that the Neville family reached a $3 million settlement on April 19 with Kimbrough and the officers, none of whom admit liability. Documents filed July 3, 2023 show that civil claims against Wellpath and the nurse were dismissed with prejudice. The charge against the nurse was later dropped.
- Edward Bronstein on 31 March 2020 in custody of California highway patrol.
- William Jennette, a truck driver, died in Marshall County jail on May 12, 2020, after police restrained him. Jennette was prone and handcuffed on the ground, with multiple officers on his back. After Jennette said he could not breathe, an officer told him: "You shouldn't be able to breathe, you stupid bastard", while other officers stayed on his back for some time. A grand jury did not charge the officers for a crime. His family tried to sue the county, officers, and Lewisburg city for his death in a federal civil rights lawsuit.
- In a video released by police, 19-year-old Keith Moses, suspected of first-degree murder, repeatedly used the term during his arrest on February 12, 2023.
- On December 3, 2025, British national Henry Nowak was stabbed five times in Southampton, England. When the police arrived, the perpetrator of the stabbing accused Nowak of assault, and the police handcuffed Nowak. Nowak died shortly after receiving first aid. Just before his death Nowak shouted at the police officer "I can't breathe".
- On January 3, 2026, Cuban national Geraldo Lunas Campos was choked to death by immigration agents at Camp East Montana in El Paso, Texas. A witness to his death said that Lunas Campos repeatedly said he couldn't breathe in Spanish.

== See also ==
- "Can't we all just get along?" – Black American victim of police brutality (1965–2012)
- "Don't tase me, bro!" – 2007 incident at a forum with John Kerry
- Eight minutes 46 seconds – Symbol for police brutality, George Floyd's murder
- "Hands up, don't shoot" – Slogan and gesture
- "How Long, Not Long" – 1965 speech by Martin Luther King Jr.
- I Can't Breathe: A Killing on Bay Street – 2017 book written by Matt Taibbi
- Killing of Daniel Prude – Death of a Black man in Rochester Police custody
- Lists of killings by law enforcement officers in the United States
- List of protests in the United States
- "No justice, no peace" – Human rights slogan
- Pain compliance – Use of painful stimulus to control or direct a person or animal
- "We Shall Overcome" – Protest song of the civil rights movement
