= Alon Steinberg =

Cardiologist and medical researcher

- Education: University of Texas Medical Branch (M.D.); Jackson Memorial Hospital, University of Miami (internship, residency); University of Miami (fellowship)
- Known for: Expert witness in the 2011 trial of Conrad Murray
- Medical career
- Profession: Cardiologist
- Field: Cardiology
- Institutions: Community Memorial Hospital of San Buenaventura; St. John's Regional Medical Center

Alon A. Steinberg is a cardiologist and medical researcher. He serves as chief of cardiology at Community Memorial Hospital of San Buenaventura in Ventura, California, and has conducted research on in-custody deaths and the physiology of prone restraint.

In 2011, Steinberg gained wider public attention as an expert witness for the prosecution in the involuntary manslaughter trial of Conrad Murray, testifying on the medical care of Michael Jackson prior to his death. He has worked with the Medical Board of California, reviewing cases concerning standards of care, and has also served as an expert witness in lawsuits involving law enforcement use of prone restraint. In a 2021 study, Steinberg proposed the concept of prone restraint cardiac arrest, which states that many prone restraint deaths, particularly in cases involving law enforcement, are caused by cardiac arrest rather than positional asphyxia.

== Education ==
Steinberg received his Doctor of Medicine from University of Texas Medical Branch. He completed his medical internship at Jackson Memorial Hospital through the University of Miami Miller School of Medicine. In 1995, he completed his residency in internal medicine at Jackson Memorial Hospital. He completed his fellowship at the University of Florida.

== Career ==
Steinberg is the chief of cardiology at Community Memorial Hospital of San Buenaventura in Ventura, California. He serves as a consultant on the Medical Board of California, where he reviews cases for compliance with the standard of care. He has been designated as a Fellow of the American College of Cardiology (F.A.C.C.). Steinberg has published several research papers on in-custody deaths and the physiology of prone restraint, and has served as an expert witness in lawsuits involving police and corrections officers' use of prone restraint.

In a 2021 paper, Steinberg proposed and introduced the term "prone restraint cardiac arrest," developing a theory that argues some deaths occurring during prone restraint, particularly in cases involving law enforcement, are caused by cardiac arrest rather than positional asphyxia. The paper, titled Prone restraint cardiac arrest: a comprehensive review of the scientific literature and an explanation of the physiology, states that a combination of metabolic acidosis, restricted ventilation, and impaired blood circulation can contribute to cardiac arrest. According to the theory, the increased physical activity often associated with a struggle involving law enforcement can produce metabolic acidosis, increasing stress on the lungs and heart to maintain breathing and blood circulation. When combined with the prone restraint position, which has been shown to decrease ventilation and cardiac output, this may precipitate cardiac arrest. Steinberg has advocated for limiting the use of prone restraint in order to prevent in-custody deaths.

In May 2025, Steinberg co-authored a study published in the Journal of Forensic and Legal Medicine titled "I can’t breathe" – A study of civil litigated cases on prone restraint deaths. The study, written with UCLA student Dhilan Patel and internal medicine specialist Dr. Amanda Frugoli, examined 229 cases of law enforcement-related prone restraint deaths in the United States over a 10-year period. It was in part a reaction to prior research suggesting that the prone restraint tactic is safe.

Steinberg has spoken on prone restraint and in-custody deaths at meetings conducted by the Police Executive Research Forum, American Academy of Forensic Sciences, National Association of Medical Examiners, Institute for Prevention of In-Custody Deaths, and the International Association of Chiefs of Police.

=== Conrad Murray trial ===
Following the death of Michael Jackson on June 25, 2009, Steinberg provided a review for the Medical Board of California of the care administered by Jackson's physician, Conrad Murray. The review was based largely on Murray's own account as given in a two-hour interview with Los Angeles Police Department detectives.

On October 12, 2011, Steinberg testified as an expert witness for the prosecution in the trial of Murray, who was charged with involuntary manslaughter in connection to Jackson's death. Murray pleaded not guilty to delivering a lethal dose of propofol. Steinberg testified that Murray’s care fell significantly below the standard of care, citing "six separate and distinct extreme deviations."

1. Administering propofol for insomnia when it is meant for anaesthesia.
2. Administering the medication outside of a monitored medical setting.
3. Lack of emergency preparation, including additional medical personnel and equipment.
4. No proper measures taken to revive Jackson when he stopped breathing.
5. Failure to call for emergency help in a timely fashion.
6. No proper keeping of records.

Steinberg further testified that, based on these deviations, the outcome was preventable, stating that "if [they] would not have happened, Mr. Jackson would have been alive." Steinberg told the court that Murray made "a direct contribution to Michael Jackson's death."

Following his testimony, Steinberg appeared on CNN multiple times to speak on his role in the Murray trial and later on the death of Whitney Houston. He was interviewed by Drew Pinsky and Piers Morgan.

== Selected publications ==
=== Articles ===
Steinberg has authored and co-authored peer-reviewed articles in the fields of cardiology and forensic medicine, including:

- Steinberg, A A; Mars, R L; Percy, R F (1998). "Effect of end-stage renal disease on decreased heart rate variability". The American Journal of Cardiology. 82 (9) (published November 1, 1998): 1156–1158. doi:10.1016/s0002-9149(98)00580-3. PMID 9817506.
- Steinberg, Alon (2021). "Prone restraint cardiac arrest: A comprehensive review of the scientific literature and an explanation of the physiology". Medicine, Science and the Law. 61 (3) (published February 25, 2021): 215–226. doi:10.1177/0025802420988370. PMID 33629624.
- Weedn, Victor; Steinberg, Alon; Speth, Peter (2022). "Prone restraint cardiac arrest in in-custody and arrest-related deaths". Journal of Forensic Sciences. 67 (5) 112652. doi:10.1111/1556-4029.15101. PMC 9546229. PMID 35869602.
- Weedn, Victor W; Steinberg, Alon; Speth, Peter (2025). "Did George Floyd Die of Cardioinhibition From Pressure on His Neck?". Academic Forensic Pathology. 15 (3) (published March 29, 2025): 109–133. doi:10.1177/19253621251327721. PMC 11955988. PMID 40171072.
- Steinberg, Alon; Patel, Dhilan; Frugoli, Amanda (2025). ""I can't breathe" – A study of civil litigated cases on prone restraint deaths". Journal of Forensic and Legal Medicine. 112 102862 (published May 2025). doi:10.1016/j.jflm.2025.102862. PMID 40267726.
- Steinberg, Alon; Patel, Dhilan; Frugoli, Amanda (2025). "The final breath on prone restraint deaths: Response to promoting the prone position paranoia". Journal of Forensic and Legal Medicine. 115 102982 (published October 2025). doi:10.1016/j.jflm.2025.102982. PMID 41109741.
- Steinberg, Alon; Frugoli, Amanda (2025). "Mortality associated with in-custody prone restraint: A review". Forensic Science International. 377 112652 (published December 2025). doi:10.1016/j.forsciint.2025.112652. PMID 40966928.

=== Letters ===
- Steinberg, Alon (2021). "Response to: Response to: Prone restraint cardiac arrest: A comprehensive review of the scientific literature and an explanation of the physiology". Medicine, Science and the Law. 62 (1) (published June 22, 2021): 79–80. doi:10.1177/00258024211025226. PMID 34156870.
- Steinberg, Alon (2021). "Response to: The prone position paradox". Medicine, Science and the Law. 62 (3) (published November 3, 2021): 236–237. doi:10.1177/00258024211051544. PMID 34730061.

== See also ==
- People v. Murray
- Death of Michael Jackson
- Community Memorial Hospital of San Buenaventura
