= Death of Kuang Zhijun =

2009 child death in Chongqing, China

Kuang Zhijun
- 匡志均
- Born: 1996; Banan District, Chongqing, China
- Died: c. November 3-4 2009 (aged 13); Chongqing, China
- Cause of death: Positional asphyxia
- Father: Kuang Jilu (匡纪绿)

The Chongqing red-clothed boy incident refers to the death of Kuang Zhijun (Chinese: 匡志均; pinyin: Kuàng Zhìjūn), a 13-year-old student, whose body was discovered in bizarre circumstances on November 5, 2009, in Shuangxing Village, Dongquan Town, Banan District, Chongqing, China. The case gained widespread attention due to the unusual condition of the body, including cross-dressing elements and complex bindings, leading to speculations of murder, ritual involvement, or supernatural causes. Official investigations concluded it was an accidental death from positional asphyxia during autoerotic activity, but controversies persist.

== Incident ==
Kuang Zhijun was a 13-year-old boy living in a rural area of Chongqing. His parents worked away from home, leaving him to attend a local boarding school and return on weekends for supplies. Described as introverted and fond of reading supernatural stories, he was last seen alive around late October 2009. When he failed to return home or to school, his absence was initially overlooked amid a flu outbreak.

On November 5, 2009, his father, Kuang Jilu, returned home and discovered the body in the family's old, rarely used house. The front door was locked from inside, and entry was made through the back door. The body was found hanging from a wooden beam by the arms, with hands and feet bound using ropes tied in approximately 24 symmetrical knots (12 on each side). A large weighing stone (about 1 kg) was attached to the feet, and a chair lay overturned nearby. Kuang was dressed in a red skirt belonging to a female relative, over a black women's swimsuit, with fabric pads inserted in the chest area to simulate breasts. A small puncture wound was noted on the forehead, with deep ligature marks on the limbs but no signs of struggle, internal injuries, drugs, or theft (e.g., money and a phone remained untouched). The room appeared disarrayed, with scattered items and candle wax drippings suggesting prior activity.

The estimated time of death was 48 hours prior, around November 3 or 4, 2009, when Kuang was exactly 13 years and 13 days old—a detail fueling later superstitions.

== Investigation ==
Local police from the Banan District, along with Chongqing forensic experts, arrived on the evening of November 5 to examine the scene. No suspect footprints or evidence of foul play were found. An autopsy confirmed asphyxiation as the cause of death, with no poisons or stimulants detected.

Initial conclusions leaned toward suicide, but the complexity of the bindings prompted reevaluation. After over a month, on December 5, 2009, authorities issued notices classifying the death as accidental, excluding homicide or suicide. The final forensic report attributed it to positional asphyxia during autoerotic activity, citing the reversible knots, cross-dressing, self-abuse indicators (e.g., wax), and comparisons to similar cases like an incident in 1984. The father appealed for reinvestigation on December 10 and 11, but requests were denied, and the case was closed.

== In popular culture ==
The incident inspired the 2015 Chinese web film The Boy in Red, released on iQIYI in 2016, which dramatized supernatural elements.
