= List of killings by law enforcement officers in the United States, September 2019 =

This is a list of people reported killed by non-military law enforcement officers in the United States in September 2019, whether in the line of duty or not, and regardless of reason or method. The listing documents the occurrence of a death, making no implications regarding wrongdoing or justification on the part of the person killed or officer involved. Killings are arranged by date of the incident that caused death. Different death dates, if known, are noted in the description. The table below lists 89 people.

== September 2019 ==
Date	Name (age) of deceased	Race	State (city)	Description
2019-09-30	Raphael Michael Torres (35)	Hispanic	Gainesville, GA	
2019-09-30	Angela Louise Perkins (38)	White	Mountain View, MO	
2019-09-29	Page, David Jaxon (20)	White	Colorado (Monument)	Monument Police responded to David Page's home after being called for a noise disturbance. Page refused to come out and eventually barricaded himself in his home. El Paso County SWAT was called and killed Page within two minutes of parking their BearCat in front of his home. It was determined that Page was holding a defunct bb gun when shot five times in his kitchen.
2019-09-29	Jamaal Ramone Taylor (31)	Black	Cockeysville, MD	
2019-09-29	Anthony Watkins (36)	White	Yucca Valley, CA	
2019-09-29	Richard Cabrera (38)	Hispanic	Florida (Miami)	
2019-09-29	Brian Mulkeen (33)	White	New York (Bronx)	
2019-09-29	Antonio Lavance Williams (27)	Black	New York (Bronx)	
2019-09-29	Isaac Rasheed Smith (37)	Black	Boston, MA	
2019-09-29	Dewayne Morgan (37)	White	Longview, TX	
2019-09-29	Anthony Wilson (61)	White	National City, CA	
2019-09-27	Chad Willis Huggins (28)	White	Leesville, SC	
2019-09-26	Randolph Valendino (29)	Hispanic	La Habra, CA	
2019-09-26	Leonard Shand (49)	Black	Hyattsville, MD	
2019-09-26	Eric DeWayne Curtis (25)	Black	Dallas, TX	
2019-09-25	Daryl Jennings Strickland (64)	White	Hartsville, SC	
2019-09-25	Kevin John Dudenhefer (32)	White	Lacombe, LA	
2019-09-25	Haywood Allan Cannon (67)	White	Richlands, NC	
2019-09-24	Jarod Lee Smith (41)	Unknown race	Huntington, WV	
2019-09-24	Elijah McClain (23)	Black	Aurora, CO	
2019-09-24	Ronald Michael McCrary (63)	Unknown race	Sanford, NC	
2019-09-23	Charles "Chase" Nation (31)	White	Lowell, AR	
2019-09-23	Raymond Hernandez (63)	Hispanic	Wilmington, CA	
2019-09-22	Fred Louis Babcock (74)	White	Austin, TX	
2019-09-22	Jeffery Tyler Aycock (28)	White	Rome, GA	
2019-09-21	Jeffrey Peterson (29)	White	Ada, OK	
2019-09-21	Anderson "Andy" Antelope (50)	Native American	Riverton, WY	
2019-09-20	Scott Johnson (57)	Unknown race	Lakewood, CO	
2019-09-20	Adam Paul English (21)	White	Gainesville, GA	
2019-09-20	Fernando Rodriguez (24)	Hispanic	Hampton, GA	
2019-09-19	John Emory Sawyer III (74)	Unknown race	Soddy-Daisy, TN	
2019-09-19	Jordan Michael Griffin (18)	Black	Long Beach, CA	
2019-09-19	Kentorrey Sims (32)	Black	Shannon, MS	
2019-09-19	Shaharah Coggins (38)	Black	Shannon, MS	
2019-09-18	Shawn Stevens (49)	Black	Pennsylvania (Pittsburgh)	
2019-09-18	Willie Hudson (33)	Black	Tennessee (Memphis)	
2019-09-18	Stephen Walter Gagliani (34)	White	Lexington, SC	
2019-09-18	Scott Gabriel Spangler (43)	White	Salem, OR	
2019-09-18	Gabriel Rouse (44)	White	Tallahassee, FL	
2019-09-17	Brian Rodden (36)	White	Oceanside, NY	
2019-09-17	Gregory Edwards (39)	Black	Staten Island, NY	
2019-09-17	Edward Matthew Guerrero-Cruz (34)	Hispanic	Milton, FL	
2019-09-17	Gay Ellen Plack (57)	White	Richmond, VA	
2019-09-16	Anthony Lonnie White (27)	Black	Texas (Houston)	
2019-09-16	Jason A. Strahan (41)	White	Staunton, IL	
2019-09-16	Jeffrey Michael Gibble (33)	White	Elizabethton, TN	
2019-09-16	Eric Carter (53)	Black	Washington, DC	
2019-09-16	Donnie Wayne Hall (50)	White	Jonesboro, GA	
2019-09-16	Kristopher Adams (37)	White	Sanger, TX	
2019-09-15	Ronald Davis (31)	Black	St. Paul, MN	
2019-09-15	Brian Dryer (28)	White	Oklahoma (Oklahoma City)	
2019-09-15	Jason Paul De La Rosa (41)	Hispanic	Katy, TX	
2019-09-14	Melvin Watkins (54)	Black	Baton Rouge, LA	
2019-09-14	Jose Luiz "Cheeze" Orona (33)	Hispanic	Plainview, TX	
2019-09-14	Nicholas Walker (31)	Black	Arlington, TX	
2019-09-14	James Hilton Glaze (76)	White	Ooltewah, TN	
2019-09-13	Robert E. Domine (77)	White	Loyal, WI	
2019-09-13	Name Withheld (25)	Unknown race	Brackettville, TX	
2019-09-12	Allen Cates (29)	White	Independence, MO	
2019-09-12	Alvaro Duran Venegas (35)	Hispanic	Santa Clarita, CA	
2019-09-12	LeEdwards "Pete" Hopkins (43)	Black	Nacogdoches, TX	
2019-09-12	Brandon Bell (17)	Black	Texas (Houston)	
2019-09-11	Tasjon Tyreek Osbourne (18)	Black	Columbus, OH	
2019-09-11	Caleb Daniel Peterson (20)	White	Burlington, IA	
2019-09-10	Bobby Ray Duckworth (26)	Black	Wellington, UT	
2019-09-09	Quentin Broadus (33)	Black	Oklahoma (Oklahoma City)	
2019-09-09	Kristopher "Kris" Fitzpatrick (41)	White	Aberdeen, WA	
2019-09-09	Hector Miranda (47)	Hispanic	Arizona (Phoenix)	
2019-09-08	Bennie Branch (24)	Black	Tacoma, WA	
2019-09-08	Christopher "Chris" P. Johnson (51)	Unknown race	Longview, WA	
2019-09-07	Quinones, Brian (30)	Hispanic	Minnesota (Richfield)	Quinones was shot dead after being pulled over for driving erratically. "Quinones appears to run at an officer before several officers fire between 10 and 11 shots."
2019-09-07	Terry Wayne Phipps Jr. (40)	White	Etoile, TX	
2019-09-06	Vondarrow Dewayne Fisher (42)	Black	Glendora, CA	
2019-09-05	Sam Burt (65)	Unknown race	Lagrange, GA	
2019-09-05	Shepherd, Cortez (28)	Black	St. Louis, Missouri	Police tried to arrest Shepherd for marijuana possession. When Shepherd reached for his gun an officer fatally shot him.
2019-09-05	Carras, John (43)	White	Connecticut (East Hartford)	Officers were called to Carras' home after a report of domestic violence. After a stun gun was ineffective, an officer shot Carras, who later died.
2019-09-05	Williams, Byron Lee (50)	Black	Nevada (Las Vegas)	Williams was pulled over in the early morning for riding his bike without a safety light and began running away from officers. After being caught by officers, Williams was subdued on his stomach with at least two officers pressing down on his back, with Williams stating multiple times; "I can't breathe". His claims were dismissed by officers as he had just ran from them and after he was pulled to his feet he went limp and was dragged away by officers. He died shortly afterwards.
2019-09-04	Kenneth Lawson (62)	Unknown race	Victorville, CA	
2019-09-04	Michael Everett Robbins (53)	White	Rigby, ID	
2019-09-04	Fares J. Al Samno (29)	White	Coeur d'Alene, ID	
2019-09-03	Attilio "Tony" A. Gilmartin (30)	White	Bluff City, TN	
2019-09-03	Terry R. "Rusty" Pierce Jr. (46)	White	Convoy, OH	
2019-09-03	Eduard Alexis Lopez-Ucles (34)	Hispanic	Kaukauna, WI	
2019-09-02	Brandon Clayton (29)	Unknown race	New York (Brooklyn)	
2019-09-02	Robert Anderson (43)	Unknown race	Silver Springs, NV	
2019-09-02	Steven Cole Gill (35)	White	Missoula, MT	
2019-09-01	Tommy Luke Hranicky (17)	White	Kerrville, TX	
2019-09-01	Sidney Holst (49)	White	Caldwell, ID	
2019-09-01	Robert Desjarlais Jr. (49)	White	Sapulpa, OK	

== See also ==
- Death in custody § United States
- Henry A. Wallace Police Crime Public Database
- List of cases of police brutality
- List of countries with annual rates and counts for killings by law enforcement officers
- List of law enforcement officers killed in the line of duty in the United States
- List of law enforcement officers convicted for an on-duty killing in the United States
- List of shootings by US immigration agents
- List of police reforms related to the George Floyd protests
- List of unarmed African Americans killed by law enforcement officers in the United States
- Lists of killings by law enforcement officers
- Police brutality in the United States
- Police misconduct § United States
- Police riot § United States
- Police use of deadly force in the United States
