= Ketamine in society and culture =

Ketamine has had a wide variety of medicinal and recreational uses since its discovery in 1962.

== Generic names ==
Ketamine is the English generic name of the drug and its INN and BAN, while ketamine hydrochloride is its USAN, USP, BANM, and JAN. Its generic name in Spanish and Italian and its DCIT are ketamina, in French and its DCF are kétamine, in German is Ketamin, and in Latin is ketaminum.

The S(+) stereoisomer of ketamine is known as esketamine, and this is its BAN while esketamine hydrochloride is its BANM.

== Brand names ==
Ketamine is sold throughout the world primarily under the brand name Ketalar. It is also marketed under a variety of other brand names, including Calypsol, Ketamin, Ketamina, Ketamine, Ketaminol, Ketanest, Ketaset, Tekam, and Vetalar among others.

Esketamine is sold mainly under the brand names Ketanest, Ketanest-S, and Spravato.

== Ketamine clinics ==
After the publication of the NIH-run antidepressant clinical trial, clinics began opening in which the intravenous ketamine is given for depression. This practice is an off label use of IV ketamine in the United States, though the intranasal version of esketamine has been approved by the FDA for treatment of depression In 2015 there were about 60 such clinics in the US; the procedure was not covered by insurance, and people paid between $400 and $1700 out of pocket for a treatment. It was estimated in 2018 that there were approximately 300 of these clinics. The number of clinics has been increasing rapidly.

A chain of such clinics in Australia, run by Aura Medical Corporation, was closed down by regulatory authorities in 2015. They found that the clinics' marketing was not supported by scientific research and the chain sent patients home with ketamine and needles to administer infusions to themselves.

== Legal status ==
While ketamine is legally marketed in many countries worldwide, it is also a controlled substance in many countries.

=== Australia ===
In Australia, ketamine is listed as a schedule 8-controlled drug under the Poisons Standard (October 2015). Schedule 8 drugs are outlined in the Poisons Act 1964 as "Substances which should be available for use but require restriction of manufacture, supply, distribution, possession and use to reduce abuse, misuse and physical or psychological dependence."

=== Canada ===
In Canada, ketamine has been classified since 2005 as a Schedule I narcotic.

=== Hong Kong ===
In Hong Kong, since 2000, ketamine has been regulated under Schedule 1 of Hong Kong Chapter 134 Dangerous Drugs Ordinance. It can be used legally only by health professionals, for university research purposes, or with a physician's prescription.

=== Taiwan ===
By 2002, ketamine was classified as Class III in Taiwan; given the recent rise of its prevalence in East Asia, however, rescheduling into Class I or II is being considered.

=== India ===
In December 2013, the government of India, in response to rising recreational use and the use of ketamine as a date rape drug, has added it to Schedule X of the Drug and Cosmetics Act, requiring a special license for sale and maintenance for two years of records of all sales.

=== United Kingdom ===
In the United Kingdom, it became labeled a Class C drug on 1 January 2006. On 10 December 2013, the UK Advisory Council on the Misuse of Drugs (ACMD) recommended that the government reclassify ketamine to become a Class B drug. On 12 February 2014 the Home Office announced it would follow this advice "in light of the evidence of chronic harms associated with ketamine use, including chronic bladder and other urinary tract damage".

The UK Minister of State for Crime Prevention, Norman Baker, responding to the ACMD's advice, said the issue of ketamine's rescheduling for medical and veterinary use would be addressed "separately to allow for a period of consultation".

=== United States ===
Because of the increase in recreational use, ketamine was placed in Schedule III of the United States Controlled Substances Act in August 1999.

== Recreational use ==
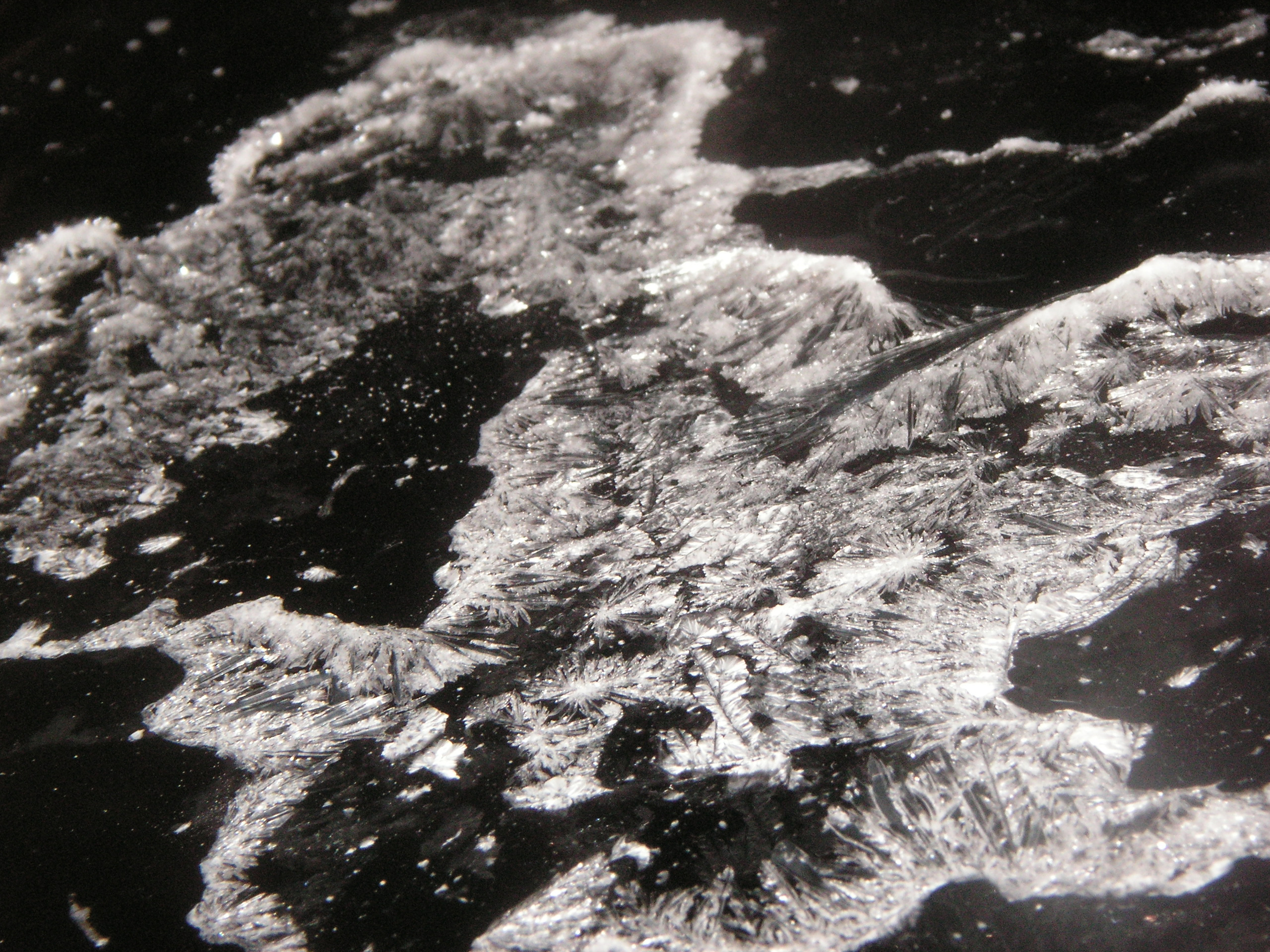
Ketamine solution poured onto glass and left to dry

Recreational use of ketamine was documented in the early 1970s in underground literature (e.g., The Fabulous Furry Freak Brothers). It was used in psychiatric and other academic research through the 1970s, culminating in 1978 with the publishing of psychonaut John Lilly's The Scientist, and Marcia Moore and Howard Alltounian's Journeys into the Bright World, which documented the unusual phenomenology of ketamine intoxication. The incidence of non-medical ketamine use increased through the end of the century, especially in the context of raves and other parties. Its emergence as a club drug differs from other club drugs (e.g., MDMA), however, due to its anesthetic properties (e.g., slurred speech, immobilization) at higher doses; in addition, reports are common of ketamine being sold as "ecstasy". In the 1993 book E for Ecstasy (about the uses of the street drug Ecstasy in the UK), the writer, activist, and ecstasy advocate Nicholas Saunders highlighted test results showing that certain consignments of the drug also contained ketamine. Consignments of ecstasy known as "strawberry" contained what Saunders described as a "potentially dangerous combination of ketamine, ephedrine, and selegiline", as did a consignment of "Sitting Duck" ecstasy tablets.

The use of ketamine as part of a "post-clubbing experience" has also been documented. Ketamine's rise in the dance culture was most rapid in Hong Kong by the end of the 1990s.

Ketamine use as a recreational drug has been implicated in deaths globally, with more than 90 deaths in England and Wales in the years of 2005–2013. They include accidental poisonings, drownings, traffic accidents, and suicides. The majority of deaths were among young people. This has led to increased regulation (e.g., upgrading ketamine from a Class C to a Class B banned substance in the U.K.).

Unlike the other well-known dissociatives phencyclidine (PCP) and dextromethorphan (DXM), ketamine is very short-acting. It takes effect within about 10 minutes, while its hallucinogenic effects last 60 minutes when insufflated or injected, and up to two hours when ingested orally.

At subanesthetic doses—under-dosaged from a medical point of view—ketamine produces a dissociative state, characterised by a sense of detachment from one's physical body and the external world which is known as depersonalization and derealization. At sufficiently high doses, users may experience what is called the "K-hole", a state of dissociation with visual and auditory hallucinations. John C. Lilly, Marcia Moore, and D. M. Turner (amongst others) have written extensively about their own entheogenic use of, and psychonautic experiences with, ketamine. Turner died prematurely due to drowning during presumed unsupervised ketamine use. In 2006 the Russian edition of Adam Parfrey's Apocalypse Culture II was banned and destroyed by authorities owing to its inclusion of an essay by David Woodard about the entheogenic use of, and psychonautic experiences with, ketamine.

Because of its ability to cause confusion and amnesia, ketamine has been used for date rape.

=== Slang terms ===
Production for recreational use has been traced to 1967, when it was referred to as "mean green" and "rockmesc". Recreational names for ketamine include "Special K", "K", "Kitty", "Ket", "K2", "Vitamin K", "Super K", "Jet", "Super acid", "Mauve", "Special LA coke", "Purple", "Cat Valium", "Keller", "Kelly's Day", "New ecstasy", "Psychedelic heroin", "bump", "Majestic". A mixture of ketamine with cocaine is called "Calvin Klein" or "CK1". In Hong Kong, where illicit use of the drug is popular, ketamine is colloquially referred to as "kai-jai".

=== Usage ===
==== North America ====
According to the ongoing Monitoring the Future study conducted by University of Michigan, prevalence rates of recreational ketamine use among American secondary school students (grades 8, 10, and 12) have varied between 0.8 and 2.5% since 1999, with recent rates at the lower end of this range. The 2006 National Survey on Drug Use and Health (NSDUH) reports a rate of 0.1% for persons ages 12 or older with the highest rate (0.2%) in those ages 18–25. Further, 203,000 people are estimated to have used ketamine in 2006, and an estimated 2.3 million people used ketamine at least once in their life. A total of 529 emergency department visits in 2009 were ketamine-related.

In 2003, the U.S. Drug Enforcement Administration conducted Operation TKO, a probe into the quality of ketamine being imported from Mexico. As a result of operation TKO, U.S. and Mexican authorities shut down the Mexico City company Laboratorios Ttokkyo, which was the biggest producer of ketamine in Mexico. According to the DEA, over 80% of ketamine seized in the United States is of Mexican origin. As of 2011, it was mostly shipped from places like India, as cheap in cost as $5/gram. The World Health Organization Expert Committee on Drug Dependence, in its thirty-third report (2003), recommended research into ketamine's recreational use due to growing concerns about its rising popularity in Europe, Asia, and North America.

==== Europe ====
Cases of ketamine use in club venues have been observed in the Czech Republic, France, Italy, Hungary, The Netherlands, and the United Kingdom. Additional reports of use and dependence have been reported in Poland and Portugal.

==== Australia ====
Australia's 2019 National Drug Strategy Household Survey report shows a prevalence of recent ketamine use of 0.3% in 2004, 0.2% in 2007 and 2010, 0.4% in 2016 and 0.9% in 2019 in persons aged 14 or older.

==== Asia ====
In China, the small village of Boshe in eastern Guangdong was confirmed as a main production centre in 2013 when it was raided.

Established by the Hong Kong Narcotics Division of the Security Bureau, the Central Registry of Drug Abuse (CRDA) maintains a database of all the illicit drug users who have come into contact with law enforcement, treatment, health care, and social organizations. The compiled data are confidential under The Dangerous Drugs Ordinance of Hong Kong, and statistics are made freely available online on a quarterly basis. Statistics from the CRDA show that the number of ketamine users (all ages) in Hong Kong has increased from 1605 (9.8% of total drug users) in 2000 to 5212 (37.6%) in 2009. Increasing trends of ketamine use among illicit drug users under the age of 21 were also reported, rising from 36.9% of young drug users in 2000 to 84.3% in 2009.

A survey conducted among school-attending Taiwanese adolescents reported prevalence rates of 0.15% in 2004, 0.18% in 2005, and 0.15% in 2006 in middle-school (grades 7 and 9) students; in Taiwanese high-school (grades 10 and 12) students, prevalence was 1.13% in 2004, 0.66% in 2005, and 0.44% in 2006. From the same survey, a large portion (42.8%) of those who reported ecstasy use also reported ketamine use. Ketamine was the second-most used illicit drug (behind ecstasy) in absconding Taiwanese adolescents as reported by a multi-city street outreach survey. In a study comparing the reporting rates between web questionnaires and paper-and-pencil questionnaires, ketamine use was reported a higher rate in the web version. Urine samples taken at a club in Taipei, Taiwan, showed high rates of ketamine use at 47.0%; this prevalence was compared with that of detainees suspected of recreational drug use in the general public, of which 2.0% of the samples tested positive for ketamine use.

== Law enforcement ==
In the late 2010s and early 2020s, law enforcement agencies in some U.S. states began directing paramedics to use ketamine to sedate people under arrest, sometimes under the auspices of treatment for the controversial diagnosis "excited delirium". The American Society of Anesthesiologists and American College of Emergency Physicians oppose the use of ketamine or any similar agent to incapacitate someone solely for a law enforcement purpose.
