= Community Memorial Hospital (disambiguation) =

Community Memorial Hospital redirects to Community Memorial Hospital of San Beuenaventura

Several other hospitals share the name Community Memorial Hospital, including:

- Community Memorial Hospital (Ayer, Massachusetts)
- Froedtert Hospital grew through merger with Community Memorial Hospital of Menomonee Falls, Wisconsin
- Lakeridge Health Port Perry is an amalgam of several hospitals in Ontario, Canada, one having once been named Community Memorial Hospital Port Perry
