= Charles Wetli =

American forensic pathologist (1943–2020)

Charles V. Wetli
- Born: Charles Victor Wetli; August 27, 1943; Green Bay, Wisconsin, US
- Died: July 28, 2020 (aged 76); Manhattan, New York, US
- Education: University of Notre Dame, Saint Louis University School of Medicine
- Known for: Excited delirium, Trans World Airlines Flight 800
- Scientific career
- Fields: Forensic pathology

Charles Victor Wetli (August 27, 1943 – July 28, 2020) was an American forensic pathologist. He is best remembered for identifying all of the victims of the Trans World Airlines Flight 800 crash in 1996 as the Suffolk County, New York medical examiner. Though he faced considerable criticism from contemporaries for his handling of the investigation into the crash, he was later praised for his ability to identify every victim's body. According to Christine Negroni, Wetli "...should be remembered as a pioneering forensic physician who assembled an array of dentists, X-ray technicians, pathologists and tiny samples of DNA to put a name on every bit of human remains recovered."

He is also noted for proposing the racist concept of "excited delirium" in a 1985 paper that he co-authored describing seven sudden deaths among female black sex workers who had recently used cocaine. He claimed that the deaths could not have been due to homicide, though they were subsequently found to be victims of a serial killer, and the scientific validity of the concept of excited delirium is generally rejected. Wetli's research into excited delirium led him to being retained by Axon Enterprise (formerly Taser International) in lawsuits where people died after being tased.

== Personal life ==
Wetli was born in Green Bay, Wisconsin on August 27, 1943. He graduated from the University of Notre Dame with a chemistry degree in 1965 before receiving his medical degree from the Saint Louis University School of Medicine in 1969. He then completed a residency in pathology before serving in the United States Army from 1973 to 1976, where he was the chief of pathology at the United States Army Medical Laboratory Pacific. He worked in Dade County, Florida for seventeen years, eventually becoming the deputy chief medical examiner there, before moving to New York in 1995. He continued to work in New York until his retirement in 2006. He died on July 28, 2020, at a hospital in Manhattan, due to complications from lung cancer. He was survived by his second wife, Geetha (Luke Poonthottam) Natarajan, whom he married in 1995, as well as by his two daughters, two sons, and seven grandchildren.
