= Positional asphyxia =

Inability to breathe due to body position or posture

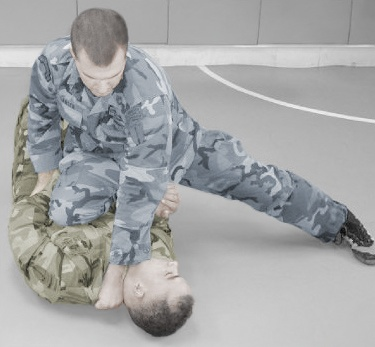
The knee-on-stomach position compresses the chest, making it difficult for the person on the bottom to breathe.

Positional asphyxia, also known as postural asphyxia, is a form of asphyxia which occurs when someone's position prevents the person from breathing adequately. People may die from positional asphyxia accidentally, when the mouth and nose are blocked, or where the chest may be unable to fully expand.

== Background ==
A 1992 article in The American Journal of Forensic Medicine and Pathology and a 2000 article in The American Journal of Forensic Medicine and Pathology said that multiple cases have been associated with the hogtie or hobble prone restraint position.

The New York Police Department's guidelines, explaining protocols for mitigating in-custody deaths, were published in a 1995 Department of Justice bulletin on "positional asphyxia." The NYPD recommended that, "[a]s soon as the subject is handcuffed, get him off his stomach. Turn him on his side or place him in a seated position." A 1996 FBI bulletin said that many law enforcement and health personnel were being taught to avoid restraining people face-down or to do so only for a very short period of time.

Resuscitation of persons who exhibit cardiac arrest following restraint has proven to be difficult, according to a 1995 article in Annals of Emergency Medicine. Even in cases where the subject was in the immediate care of paramedics, resuscitation has failed and the subject has died. A March 1999 article in the Academic Emergency Medicine journal reported that one group of doctors had presented a method of resuscitation, correcting acidosis in the blood of the victim, which proved effective in their small scale study. A 2010 article in the Journal of the Tennessee Medical Association reported a single case of successful resuscitation using "aggressive sedation", "ventilatory assistance" among other interventions but added that "avoiding hobble and prone restraint positions may eliminate some of the problems".

In 1997 Annals of Emergency Medicine article reported on a single small laboratory study in which "15 healthy men ages 18 through 40 years" were placed in the "hobble" or "hog-tie" restraint position. Researchers found that the effects of restraint on the breathing and oxygen levels these 15 healthy men, was limited.

A 2002 review of the literature published in the British Journal of Forensic Practice said that restraining a person in a face-down position is likely to cause greater restriction of breathing than restraining a person face-up.

A 2008 article in Medicine, Science and the Law said that the way the subject is restrained can also increase the risk of death, for example kneeling or otherwise placing weight on the subject and particularly any type of restraint hold around the subject's neck. Research measuring the effect of restraint positions on lung function suggests that restraint which involves bending the restrained person or placing body weight on them has more effect on their breathing than face-down positioning alone.

In the United States, there were 16 reported deaths in police custody between 1998 and 2009 in which restraint was a "direct or contributory factor to the death." The investigation into the deaths resulted in a 2010 report tabled by the Independent Police Complaints Commission (IPCC).

Prolonged (particularly resisted) restraint, obesity, prior cardiac or respiratory problems, and the use of illicit drugs such as cocaine can increase the risk of death by restraint, according to a 2001 article in American Journal of Emergency Medicine.

Positional asphyxia is not limited to restraint in a face down position according to a 2011 article in Medicine, Science, and the Law. Restraining a person in a seated position may also reduce the ability to breathe, if the person is pushed forwards with the chest on or close to the knees. The risk will be higher in cases where the restrained person has a high body mass index (BMI) and/or large waist girth.

A 2012 series by the Bureau of Investigative Journalism (TBIJ) reported that, since the late 1990s, coroners used the term excited delirium to explain restraint-related deaths involving police officers. A May 1997 article in Wiener klinische Wochenschrift said that deaths in real life situations occur after excited delirium, which had not been studied in laboratory simulations at that time.

== Accident or illness ==
Positional asphyxia may also occur as a result of accident or illness, according to a 2008 article in the Journal of Forensic and Legal Medicine. This can include bed rail strangulation.

A 2008 EMBO Reports article on sudden infant death syndrome, said that the number of diagnoses of 'accidental suffocation', 'wedging' or 'positional asphyxia' had increased."

Olympic track athlete Florence Griffith Joyner and ex-Major League Baseball player John Marzano both died due to positional asphyxia, the former following an epileptic seizure and the latter following a fall down a flight of stairs. Politician James Traficant died of positional asphyxia after being trapped under a tractor on his farm property.
