= Killing of Elijah McClain =

2019 homicide of man under police custody

- Elijah McClain in an undated photo
- Location: Aurora, Colorado, U.S.
- Date: August 30, 2019
- Attack type: Homicide by unlawful administration of drugs, assault, police brutality
- Weapon: Illegal 500 mg injection of ketamine
- Victims: Elijah Jovan McClain, aged 23 (died 6 days later)
- Perpetrators: Randy Roedema; Jeremy Cooper; Peter Cichuniec
- Accused: Nathan Woodyard; Jason Rosenblatt
- Charges: Manslaughter: Criminally negligent homicide (lesser included offense); Rosenblatt, Cooper, Cichuniec: Second-degree assault: Third-degree assault (lesser included offense)
- Verdict: Roedema, Cooper, Cichuniec: Guilty on the lesser included offense of negligent homicide Roedema: Guilty of third-degree assault Rosenblatt and Woodyard: Not guilty on all counts Cooper: Not guilty on two counts of second-degree assault Cichuniec: Guilty of second-degree assault causing death, not guilty of second-degree assault with intent to cause bodily harm
- Convictions: Roedema: Criminally negligent homicide, third-degree assault Cooper: Criminally negligent homicide Cichuniec: Criminally negligent homicide, second-degree assault causing death
- Sentence: Roedema: 1 year and 2 months imprisonment Cooper: 4 years probation, 100 hours community service Cichuniec: 4 years probation

Elijah Jovan McClain (February 25, 1996 – August 30, 2019) was a 23-year-old black American man from Aurora, Colorado, who was killed as a result of being illegally injected with 500 mg of ketamine by paramedics after being forcibly detained by police officers. He went into cardiac arrest and died six days later in the hospital. He had been walking home from a convenience store. Three police officers and two paramedics were charged with his death. Both paramedics and one of the officers were convicted of negligent homicide. The paramedics conviction was overturned and is pending a new trial. The other two officers were acquitted of all charges.

On August 24, 2019, three Aurora Police officers confronted McClain after responding to a call by an Aurora civilian about an unarmed person wearing a ski mask that looked "sketchy". The three police officers who were involved in the incident (Nathan Woodyard, Jason Rosenblatt, and Randy Roedema) all said that their body cameras were knocked off during a struggle with McClain. McClain was forcibly held to the ground with his hands cuffed behind his back, after which Woodyard twice applied a choke hold. Upon arrival paramedics Jeremy Cooper and Peter Cichuniec administered ketamine, later determined to be in excess of a therapeutic dosage, to McClain to sedate him. While on scene McClain went into cardiac arrest. Three days after arriving at the hospital, he was declared brain dead, and was removed from life support on August 30.

McClain's initial autopsy was inconclusive and the cause of death was listed as undetermined. Aurora Police officers met with the coroner before his announcement, and police investigators were also present during the autopsy. As a result of a lawsuit by several news agencies, an amended autopsy report was released in September 2022 that listed the cause of death as "complications of ketamine administration following forcible restraint".

On June 24, 2020, after massive protests in Denver and Aurora and lawmakers' requests for a new, third-party investigation into McClain's death, Colorado Governor Jared Polis announced his administration would reexamine the case. Five days later, photos were discovered that were taken in October 2019 at the site where McClain was assaulted and killed. The photos showed officers posing inappropriately and reenacting the carotid restraint used on McClain. One officer, Jaron Jones, resigned and three (Erica Marrero, Kyle Dittrich, and Jason Rosenblatt) were fired.

In February 2021, an investigative report ordered by the City Council was released. The report said that the police officers involved in McClain's death did not have the legal basis to stop, restrain, or frisk him. The report questioned the police officers' statements, criticized the medical responders' decision to inject McClain with a sedative, and admonished the police department for failing to perform a serious questioning of the officers following McClain's death.

In September 2021, the three police officers (Woodyard, Rosenblatt, and Roedema) and two paramedics (Cooper and Cichuniec) were arrested and charged through a Colorado grand jury with manslaughter and other lesser charges for the death of Elijah McClain. Nathan Woodyard was tried on October 17, 2023, and was found not guilty on November 6. Rosenblatt was acquitted of all charges against him, including reckless manslaughter and assault.

On October 12, 2023, Roedema was found guilty on charges of criminally negligent homicide and assault. He was sentenced on January 5, 2024 by District Judge Mark Warner to 14 months at the Adams County Jail in Brighton, Colorado, with possibility of work-release, plus 200 hours community service.

The trial of paramedics Jeremy Cooper and Peter Cichuniec began on November 29, 2023. On December 22, the two paramedics involved in McClain's death were found guilty of negligent homicide by a Colorado jury, which found that Peter Cichuniec's unlawful administration of drugs to McClain was a key factor in causing his death. On March 1, 2024, Cichuniec was given the mandatory minimum sentence of five years in prison, and on April 26, Cooper was sentenced to four years of probation. On September 14, Cichuniec's sentence was reduced to four years probation. Both paramedics homicide convictions were overturned on June 4, 2026 by Colorado appeals courts.

== Background ==
At the time of his death, Elijah McClain had been a massage therapist for about four years. He shared an apartment with his cousin close to the site where he was taken into police custody and subsequently died. He had never been arrested or charged with a crime. Friends and family described him as a "spiritual seeker, pacifist, oddball, vegetarian, athlete, and peacemaker who was exceedingly gentle."

McClain's mother, Sheneen, moved her family of six from Denver to Aurora to avoid gang violence. She said Elijah was home-schooled and she could see at an early age that he was "intellectually gifted, but fiercely independent". While still a teenager, he taught himself to play violin and guitar. During lunch breaks, he played his instruments at animal shelters to soothe the abandoned animals. Friends said that his gentleness with animals extended to humans as well. One of his clients recalled him as "the sweetest, purest person I have ever met. He was definitely a light in a whole lot of darkness". An acquaintance said, "I don't even think he would set a mousetrap if there was a rodent problem."

Despite widespread speculation, McClain was never formally diagnosed as being on the autism spectrum, according to his family. However, autistic Black people and their families have sometimes said that they identify with him.

== Killing ==
External videos
- Audio recording of the 9-1-1 call made on McClain and police body camera footage of McClain being apprehended. on YouTube (3 hour 8 min 30 sec)

On the evening of August 24, 2019, an Aurora civilian called 9-1-1 reporting a male around Billings Street and Evergreen Avenue walking south on Billings Street wearing a ski mask and flailing his arms. The caller affirmed during the call that he did not believe the person was armed and that he did not believe that anyone was in immediate danger. Friends of McClain interviewed after the incident speculated that this arm-flailing was most likely just dancing, as he is believed to have been listening to music at the time of the call. McClain was dressed warmly and was wearing a ski mask because he had a blood circulation disorder that caused him to chill easily.

According to the police report, McClain resisted when confronted by the responding police officers, and Officers Woodyard and Rosenblatt heard Officer Roedema shout "He is going for your gun!" An attorney representing McClain's family said the officers involved slammed McClain into a wall immediately after apprehending him. Roedema said that McClain "reached for and grabbed the grip of Rosenblatt's gun that was holstered". There are conflicting accounts about the officer's report that McClain had tried to grab his gun. Later accounts offered differing reports on whose gun McClain had tried to grab. There was no visual body-camera footage of McClain's alleged reach for the gun, which the officers explained by stating that all of their cameras had fallen off. However, a news source states, "But if you watch the video from about the 15-minute mark (warning: It contains violent and upsetting content), you'll see someone pick up the body camera and point it toward McClain and one of the officers before dropping it back into the grass. Around 15:34, one of the officers seems to say, 'Leave your camera there.'"

The three police officers held McClain on the ground for 15 minutes. McClain was clearly in distress while restrained, sobbing and repeatedly saying "I can't breathe". He vomited several times, for which he apologized, saying: "I'm sorry. I wasn't trying to do that, I can't breathe correctly." While McClain's arms were handcuffed behind his back, Woodyard applied a carotid control hold, which intentionally cuts off blood flow to the brain by compressing the carotid arteries in the neck, rendering McClain briefly unconscious. One officer threatened to have his police dog bite McClain as he lay handcuffed and pinned to the ground.

After McClain was restrained, more officers arrived and audio of the conversation records them saying that McClain was "acting crazy", that he was "definitely on something", and that he had attacked them with "incredible, crazy strength" when they tried to restrain him. They also said that, at one point, three officers were on top of McClain, who was 5 feet 6 inches (1.68 m) tall and weighed 140 pounds (64 kg). Paramedics injected him with 500 mg of ketamine—whereas local protocols stipulate a dose of about 320 mg to 350 mg for an individual of his weight—as a sedative for excited delirium. McClain was then transferred to the ambulance. The medic who had administered ketamine noticed McClain's chest "was not rising on its own, and he did not have a pulse." He was pronounced brain dead on August 27 and died three days later, on August 30, 2019.

The body cameras came detached from the police officer's uniforms during the encounter, but the audio can still be heard. During the recording, when one of the body cameras was still attached to an officer, another officer can be heard telling him to move his camera. The attorney representing McClain's family accused the officers of deliberately removing their body cameras to support a false allegation that McClain reached for a gun, though evidence for this wasn't found during the subsequent investigation.

=== Last words ===
According to body cam audio, these were McClain's last words as he was restrained by police officers:

I can't breathe. I have my ID right here. My name is Elijah McClain. That's my house. I was just going home. I'm an introvert. I'm just different. That's all. I'm so sorry. I have no gun. I don't do that stuff. I don't do any fighting. Why are you attacking me? I don't even kill flies! I don't eat meat! But I don't judge people, I don't judge people who do eat meat. Forgive me. All I was trying to do was become better. I will do it. I will do anything. Sacrifice my identity, I'll do it. You all are phenomenal. You are beautiful and I love you. Try to forgive me. I'm a mood Gemini. I'm sorry. I'm so sorry. Ow, that really hurt! You are all very strong. Teamwork makes the dream work. [after vomiting] Oh, I'm sorry, I wasn't trying to do that. I just can't breathe correctly.

=== Coroner report ===
According to the original autopsy report from Adams County Coroner's Office, released in November 2019, McClain's exact cause of death could not be determined and was therefore listed as undetermined. The county coroner Doctor Stephen Cina stated that it may have been an accident resulting from an idiosyncratic drug reaction, could have been homicide if the officers' use of the carotid hold contributed to his death, or could have been "natural if (McClain) had an undiagnosed mental illness that led to excited delirium, if his intense physical exertion combined with a narrow coronary artery led to an arrhythmia, if he had an asthma attack, or if he aspirated vomit while restrained.”

The coroner stated that McClain's "physical exertion" likely contributed to his death, ”but it is unclear if the officer's actions contributed as well" and described McClain as being given a “therapeutic level” of ketamine.

Aurora Police Department officers met with the coroner before his final decision that the cause of death could not be determined was announced and Aurora police investigators were also present during the autopsy even while the actions of several of the department's officers were under review. According to a national coroners group, best practice would have been to seek a second opinion in order to avoid an undetermined ruling.

On September 2, 2022, chief coroner of Adams County Monica Broncucia-Jordan announced the autopsy report of McClain had been changed in response to new evidence from a grand jury investigation. Following a request by the Colorado Public Radio it was confirmed that the autopsy had been updated to list the cause of death as "complications of ketamine administration following forcible restraint", but the manner of death was still listed as "undetermined" rather than "homicide".

"The investigation suggests that [McClain] received an intramuscular dose of ketamine that was higher than recommended for his weight," Adams County chief coroner Monica Broncucia-Jordan autopsy report read. "Further, my review of all the body camera footage shows that Mr. McClain was extremely sedated within minutes of receiving a shot of ketamine. When he was placed on a stretcher, I believe he was displaying agonal breathing and respiratory arrest was imminent. Simply put, this dosage of ketamine was too much for this individual and it resulted in an overdose, even though his blood ketamine level was consistent with a 'therapeutic' blood concentration. I believe that Mr. McClain would most likely be alive but for the administration of ketamine."

The amended report also states that there was “no evidence that injuries inflicted by the police contributed to death. The original report stated that McClain went unresponsive “during a police involved interaction.” The report was amended to say that McClain became unresponsive “immediately following a police involved interaction.”

== Investigation ==
On August 28, 2019, all three Aurora Police officers involved at the scene were put on paid administrative leave. Adams County District Attorney Dave Young later determined that none of the three officers—Nathan Woodyard, Jason Rosenblatt, and Randy Roedema—committed any criminal acts, and no charges were filed against them. The police body camera footage and audio of the initial 9-1-1 call were released publicly by the Aurora Police Department on November 22, 2019.

In February 2020, Aurora City Manager Jim Twombly announced that he would begin a Critical Incident Review on the case to investigate how police and fire departments reacted during the incident. He also announced an audit on the body cameras of the Aurora Police Department to further investigate how well Aurora police officers comply with body-camera policies. At that time he said that a review of the incident determined that the force applied during the encounter was consistent with training as determined by the Force Review Board.

=== Petitions and investigation requests ===
On June 6, 2020, an online petition called for a reopening of the investigation into the death of McClain, and a request that the officers involved be removed from duty had been signed by more than 820,000 people. Members of the Aurora City Council's safety committee also requested an independent, third-party investigation into the death. County District Attorney Dave Young said he was aware of the petition and commented, "I don't open up investigations based on petitions."

On June 10, three members of the city public safety policy committee sent City Manager Jim Twombly a letter asking for a new "neutral, third-party" look at McClain's death. Twombly responded saying that the city had already initiated an independent review of his death under the direction of Eric Daigle, a former Connecticut state police officer and attorney who now consults on the use of force and related policies. Council members replied saying they were not satisfied with the city's choice of a former police officer: "[We] don't consider Eric Daigle to be independent and neutral due to his long career in law enforcement. We need a truly independent review."

On June 26, a spokesperson for the city of Aurora announced that all three officers involved in the incident had been reassigned to working in a non-enforcement capacity in an attempt to protect their safety. Woodyard and Rosenblatt were moved on June 13, while Roedema was moved on June 20.

By June 25, more than three million people had signed the petition demanding an independent investigation into McClain's death, and on that date, Governor Jared Polis appointed a special prosecutor to investigate McClain's death, thus overriding Young and Twombly. He also signed an executive order directing the Attorney General, Phil Weiser, to investigate and possibly prosecute the officers involved. Polis said in a statement, "Elijah McClain should be alive today, and we owe it to his family to take this step and elevate the pursuit of justice in his name to a statewide concern." Mari Newman, the family's attorney, commented, "Finally a responsible adult has stepped in and thank goodness that the governor has shown some leadership."

=== Inappropriate photos investigated ===
On June 29, the interim police chief announced that multiple officers had been placed on administrative leave and were under investigation after photos of them surfaced that had been taken near the site where McClain was taken into custody. The photos, taken in October 2019, show police officers posing inappropriately and reenacting the carotid restraint used on McClain before his death. In July, three officers were fired from the department in relation to the photos, while one officer resigned.

At a news conference, acting police chief Vanessa Wilson said, "While the allegations of this internal affairs case are not criminal, they are a crime against humanity and decency. To even think about doing such a thing is beyond comprehension and it is reprehensible." In response to a question from the floor, she addressed aspects of future officer training, and noted: "I shouldn't have to teach this. There is no training that should [have to] teach human decency."

=== Use of ketamine questioned ===
In Colorado, EMS providers are allowed to use ketamine to treat a syndrome known as excited delirium. When the EMS arrived on the scene of the encounter, McClain was already cuffed and restrained on the ground. One of the officers can be heard telling the EMS that McClain was "acting crazy", that he was "definitely on something", and that he had attacked them with "incredible, crazy strength" when they tried to restrain him. The paramedics administered an injection of 500 mg (one full 5ml syringe) of ketamine, later reporting to have estimated his weight at 220lbs (100kg), a weight for which 500 mg is an appropriate dose. According to information provided to NBC by Aurora Fire Rescue, the standard dose of ketamine is 5 milligrams per each kilogram of a person's weight. The coroner's report states that McClain was 5 feet 6 inches (1.68 m) tall and weighed 140 pounds (64 kg). That would mean that the correct dosage for a person of McClain's size would have been 320 milligrams.

The attorney for McClain's family, Mari Newman, said that medics had no right or reason to inject Elijah with ketamine and has asked for an investigation. Neuroscientist Carl Hart, chair of Columbia University's psychology department, commented, "Why anyone would be giving ketamine in that circumstance is beyond me." The American Medical Association, the American Psychiatric Association, and the World Health Organization do not recognize the condition known as excited delirium. Paul Appelbaum, who oversees changes to psychiatry's main diagnostic manual, has commented, "excited delirium is bad science, based on faulty studies that grew out of the 1980s cocaine epidemic." Carl Takei, a senior staff attorney for the American Civil Liberties Union who focuses on police practices, said "ascribing a person's actions to excited delirium can create a shield for officers who use excessive force".

In December 2020, John Dickerson, working for the television program 60 Minutes, investigated the use of ketamine in McClain's death. Dickerson said that the medical community is highly skeptical about whether "excited delirium" is a real medical condition and voiced concerns about the use of excited delirium as "a shield to protect police from charges of misconduct." Dickerson spoke with County District Attorney Dave Young, whose jurisdiction covers Aurora. Young justified the use of ketamine. He also felt that because the diagnosis of excited delirium was not ruled out as a cause of death, he was convinced that he could not win a homicide case against the officers because "you can't file a homicide charge without cause of death."

=== February 2021 investigation findings ===
Findings from an independent investigation commissioned by the City Council were released on February 22, 2021. The report concluded that "Aurora police and paramedics made substantial errors at nearly every stage of their interaction with Elijah McClain and the detectives tasked with investigating the incident that led to the 23-year-old's death stretched the truth to exonerate the officers involved." The report said that the police had no legal basis to make McClain stop walking, to frisk him, or to use a chokehold and the paramedics failed to properly evaluate him, measure his vital signs – or even to attempt to speak with him – before injecting him with ketamine. The report also said that the detectives assigned to investigate the incident failed to do a meaningful investigation after his death. According to the report:

The body worn camera audio, limited video, and Major Crimes’ interviews with the officers tell two contrasting stories. The officers’ statements on the scene and in subsequent recorded interviews suggest a violent and relentless struggle. The limited video, and the audio from the body worn cameras, reveal Mr. McClain surrounded by officers, all larger than he, crying out in pain, apologizing, explaining himself, and pleading with the officers."

In 2020, McClain's family filed a lawsuit naming the city, several police officers and paramedics, and a fire department medical director for allegedly violating McClain's civil rights. Family attorney Mari Newman said the report supports the plaintiff allegations. "This is a broadside on the city of Aurora from top to bottom, beginning with the illegal stop that set the wheels in motion and the illegal conduct every step of the way." McClain's mother said she was happy that the report showed that her son was no longer labeled a suspect but rather seen as a victim of a crime. She has called for the paramedics and the officers to be fired and criminally prosecuted. In a statement his father said, "This report confirms what we have been saying from the start."

=== September 2021 grand jury ===
In September 2021, a Colorado grand jury indicted Aurora officers Roedema, Rosenblatt and Woodyard along with Aurora Fire Rescue paramedics Cooper and Cichuniec on 32 total counts of manslaughter and criminally negligent homicide. In addition, Roedema and Rosenblatt were each indicted on one count of assault and one count of crime of violence, while Cooper and Cichuniec each faced three counts of assault and six counts of crime of violence. As of April 2022, all five individuals remained free on bond.

=== Release of the unredacted, amended autopsy report ===
In September 2022, CPR News (Colorado Public Radio) filed a lawsuit, in which they were joined by the Associated Press (AP News), KCNC-TV, KDVR-TV, KMGH-TV, KUSA-TV, and Denver7 arguing the amended autopsy report should be released to the public without redactions. The report, without redactions, was released on September 24. The cause of death, which was previously listed as "undetermined," now states as "complications of ketamine administration following forcible restraint". The manner of death remains listed as "undetermined" as it was in the initial report.

=== 2023 trials ===
In January 2023, trial dates were set starting with July 11, 2023, for Roedema and Rosenblatt, August 7, 2023, for Cooper and Chichuniec, and September 18, 2023, for Woodyard. All five entered not guilty pleas in Adams County court.

In late September, former Aurora PD captain Stephen Redfearn testified about changing the incident code from “suspicious person” to “assault on an officer”, but without further investigating the incident. "He said the computer system didn't have a category for attempting to disarm an officer". Civil rights group NAACP Boulder County claimed the change "reeks of a cover-up" and called for Redfearn's current employer, the Boulder Police Department, to fire him and his boss, Chief Maris Herold, for hiring him. Boulder's city manager pushed back, saying NAACP misrepresented the facts and said the code change was a standard innocuous administrative task.

On October 12, 2023, Roedema, a resident from Thornton, was found guilty on charges of criminally negligent homicide and assault, while Rosenblatt was acquitted of all charges against him, including reckless manslaughter and assault. Roedema was sentenced to 14 months' imprisonment in January 2024.

Nathan Woodyard's trial began on October 17. One of the prosecution witnesses was police trainer Kevin Smyth, who had previously testified in the trial of the other two officers. Smyth's testimony at Woodyard's trial, that officers were trained to take suspects' claims of being unable to breathe seriously but that such complaints were not always a sign of respiratory failure, was said by the prosecution to contradict his previous testimony. Woodyard's lawyers argued that the paramedics who sedated McClain were responsible for his death. Closing arguments began on November 3. On November 6 a jury acquitted Woodyard.

Cooper and Cichuniec's trial began on November 29, 2023. During the trial, Cooper admitted that he had misjudged the amount of ketamine necessary to subdue McClain, leading to the fatal overdose.

On December 22, 2023, Cooper and Cichuniec were convicted by a Colorado jury of criminally negligent homicide for their role in McClain's death. The jury additionally found Cichuniec guilty of second-degree assault for his unlawful administration of drugs to McClain. On March 1, 2024, Cichuniec was sentenced to five years in prison and three years probation and was imprisoned in the Sterling Correctional Facility. Following an appeal, his sentence was reduced to four years of probation on September 13th, 2024.

== Protests and memorials ==
A very small protest was held in November 2019 in response to the District Attorney's decision not to file charges. McClain's mother Sheneen was scheduled to take part but was in too much grief to appear and speak.

A second event for McClain was held on June 6, 2020, after the murder of George Floyd led to the formation of a nationwide protest movement in the United States. One of the event organizers remarked that the McClain family must have felt that the death of their loved one had been in vain when they saw the streets of Denver filled with protesters showing support for George Floyd while their loved one seemed to have been all but forgotten. One speaker said, "Today, I see all of your faces. And although it happened because of George Floyd, if we're not dealing with the atrocities, with the murders, with the brutality inside of Aurora, we have no business shouting another person's name."

In June 2020, a memorial mural was painted in honor of McClain in Denver, Colorado, alongside murals of George Floyd and Breonna Taylor.

=== Violin protest ===
On June 27, 2020, thousands gathered for a day of protests, speaker presentations, and an evening violin concert at Aurora City Center Park. Before the protest began, Aurora police issued a statement in support of a peaceful protest but warned of "outsiders" whose goal, they said, is to be destructive. Government buildings were boarded up, and police sat atop City Hall and the library observing the protest.

No arrests were reported during the day, although both directions of Interstate 225 were shut down around 3 p.m. by thousands of marching protesters. In the evening people, including families with children, started to gather in City Center Park, where musicians formed a circle and performed a violin concert in memory of McClain, who had been an accomplished violinist. At that point, law enforcement declared the protest an "illegal gathering" and ordered people to leave the park or face the use of pepper spray for dispersal. Shortly thereafter police officers, dressed in riot gear, moved into the crowd. Several attendees reported the use of smoke and gas canisters. According to a police statement, "pepper spray was used after a small group of people gathered rocks [and] sticks, knocked over a fence, and ignored orders to move back". Various videos showed attendees seated on the public lawn, without engaging in any such actions.

Five attendees of the protest have sued the Aurora Police Department and its interim chief, accusing them of unconstitutional treatment. Their lawsuit also demands that the Aurora Police Department stop using chemical agents, stop shooting projectiles indiscriminately into crowds, allow crowd dispersal only when there is an urgent danger to other people, and require all police to have their body cameras on at all times.

On June 29, 2020, an event in memory of Elijah McClain was held in California. It was organized by Black Women Lead, took place at The Laugh Factory Hollywood, and was called "Violin Candlelight Vigil for Elijah". The small concert was held in the open air, the visitors formed a circle around the stage, watching performing musicians. Among the performers were violinist Lindsey Stirling, who played her arrangement of the song "Hallelujah", and violinist and vocalist Sudan Archives.

After McClain's death, a petition was published on the public benefit corporation website, change.org asking for "Justice for Elijah McClain." The petition quickly gathered enough signatures to become one of the top three most signed petitions on the site, among others such as those petitions on behalf of George Floyd and Breonna Taylor.

== Arrest of protest organizers ==
Following the summer protests, Aurora Police Department arrested organizers involved with the Party for Socialism and Liberation and other local groups on charges ranging from "inciting a riot" to "kidnapping". This was in response to a protest on July 3 where the Aurora police precinct was surrounded by protesters calling for the officers responsible for McClain's death to be fired and charged. On September 17, 6 organizers, Russel Ruch, Joel Northam, Lillian House, Eliza Lucero, Trey Quinn, and Terrance Roberts, were arrested. Northam was arrested with the aid of a SWAT team and armored vehicle, while Roberts was apprehended while on a jog. Others were arrested at home or at work. The charges could have resulted in up to 48 years in prison for House, Northam, and Lucero.

On March 12, 2021, Judge Leroy Kirby dismissed the kidnapping charges against House, Lucero, and Northam, noting that if the warrants for their arrest had been presented to him, he would not have signed them. On April 4, 2021, Arapahoe County District Attorney John Keller dismissed all felony charges and major misdemeanor charges against the protesters. On May 6, 2021, Adams County District Attorney Brian Mason dismissed all charges in Adams County against the protesters, stating that he has "an ethical obligation to only proceed on charges [his] office can prove and to dismiss charges that [they] cannot prove." On September 13, 2021, all remaining charges against House, Lucero, and Northam were dropped.

== Civil rights lawsuit ==
McClain's family subsequently filed a civil rights lawsuit against the city of Aurora, Colorado. A preliminary settlement agreement was announced on October 18, 2021. The agreement was finalized following a mediation hearing in U.S. District Court on November 19, 2021, with the city of Aurora agreeing to pay $15 million to McClain's family.

== See also ==
- List of unarmed African Americans killed by law enforcement officers in the United States
- Lists of killings by law enforcement officers in the United States
- List of killings by law enforcement officers in the United States, August 2019
- Killing of Daniel Prude
- Ketamine Safety and Use in the Emergency Department for Pain and Agitation/Delirium: A Health System Experience
- Ketamine as a rescue treatment for severe acute behavioural disturbance: A prospective prehospital study
- Ketamine Considerations for Prehospital Use
