= List of killings by law enforcement officers in the United States, August 2019 =

This is a list of people reported killed by non-military law enforcement officers in the United States in August 2019, whether in the line of duty or not, and regardless of reason or method. The listing documents the occurrence of a death, making no implications regarding wrongdoing or justification on the part of the person killed or officer involved. Killings are arranged by date of the incident that caused death. Different death dates, if known, are noted in the description. The table below lists 104 people.

== August 2019 ==
Date	Name (age) of deceased	Race	State (city)	Description
2019-08-31	Kobe Dimock-Heisler (21)	Black	Minnesota (Brooklyn Center)	Three officers responding to a call shortly after 4:20 p.m. shot Dimock-Heisler within minutes of entering the home where he lived with his grandparents. His grandfather placed the 9-1-1 call out of concern that Dimock-Heisler was suicidal and later told dispatchers "he's probably going to be okay" and to "just forget it." Dimock-Heisler, who was on the autism spectrum, was disarmed and repeatedly tased before being shot.
2019-08-31	Name Withheld	Unknown race	Raleigh, NC	
2019-08-31	Shawn Earl Fondren (47)	White	Florence, MS	
2019-08-31	Seth Aaron Ator (36)	White	Odessa, TX	
2019-08-31	Juan Carlos Macias (37)	Hispanic	Denver, CO	
2019-08-31	Terry Tillman (23)	Black	Clayton, MO	
2019-08-30	Stephen Gilliard (27)	Black	Jamaica, NY	
2019-08-30	Alberto Wayne Martinez (32)	Hispanic	Red Bluff, CA	
2019-08-30	Rene Enrique Ruiz (51)	Hispanic	Tolleson, AZ	
2019-08-30	Jason Gonzalez (39)	Hispanic	California (Bakersfield)	
2019-08-30	Ricardo Henry Hylton (35)	Black	Wilmington, DE	
2019-08-29	Randall Felipe Gamboa Jr. (16)	Hispanic	Carlsbad, NM	
2019-08-28	Tyrone Domingo Banks (30)	Black	Maryland (Baltimore)	
2019-08-28	Wallace Wilder (62)	Black	Gordo, AL	
2019-08-28	Jeremy "Jeremiah" Paul Connolly (28)	White	Salina, KS	
2019-08-27	Keith Carter (52)	Black	Baton Rouge, LA	
2019-08-27	Raymond Lewis Williams (37)	Black	West Helena, AR	
2019-08-27	Bobby Ray Moore (67)	Unknown race	Stockton, CA	
2019-08-27	Willie Lamont Sample (39)	Black	Overland, MO	
2019-08-27	Arthur Walton (33)	Black	Illinois (Maywood)	An off duty Melrose Park officer shot two brothers after an argument, wounding one and killing the other, Arthur Walton. The officer was later taken into custody.
2019-08-26	Channara "Philly" Pheap	Asian	Tennessee (Knoxville)	"Philly" Pheap was suspected of a hit and run. According to eyewitnesses, he was shot twice in the back by KPD Officer Dylan M. Williams. There is no camera footage of the incident.
2019-08-26	Kevin Phoummany (38)	Native Hawaiian and Pacific Islander	Anchorage, AK	
2019-08-25	Taylor Joseph Ware (24)	White	Dale, IN	
2019-08-24	Dennis Carolino (52)	Native Hawaiian and Pacific Islander	San Diego, CA	
2019-08-24	Larry Leonard Lowry Jr. (34)	White	Cottage Grove, OR	
2019-08-24	Elijah McClain (23)	Black	Colorado (Aurora)	A 911 call was made after McClain was spotted walking down a street wearing a ski mask while flailing his arms and listening to music. When police arrived, they tackled him to the ground, held him down for 15 minutes, and injected him with ketamine. McClain suffered from two heart attacks on the way to the hospital and was pronounced brain dead on August 30, 2019.
2019-08-23	Antonio Tavares (65)	Hispanic	Brockton, Massachusetts	Tavares, a pedestrian, was fatally struck by a police vehicle responding to an emergency call. He died in hospital.
2019-08-23	Daryl L. Perkins (55)	White	Danville, IL	
2019-08-23	Chad Michael Breinholt (31)	White	Utah (West Valley City)	While in custody at the police department, Breinholt, who was handcuffed with his hands behind his back, briefly got into a struggle with two officers. After an officer yelled that Breinholt was allegedly trying to take his gun, a sergeant entered the room, declared "You're about to die, my friend," and shot Breinholt. The sergeant had been involved in two separate shootings before.
2019-08-22	William Lloyd Jones (49)	White	Arkansas (Van Buren County)	Jones was shot and killed by a police officer.
2019-08-22	Michael Tuck (29)	Black	Dayton, OH	
2019-08-22	Gary E. Strobridge (49)	White	Elmira, NY	
2019-08-22	Roberto Mata (46)	Hispanic	Hobbs, NM	
2019-08-22	Roger Schafer (57)	White	New Mexico (Albuquerque)	
2019-08-22	Rafael Chavez Franco (26)	Hispanic	Westminster, CA	
2019-08-22	Riley Eugene Peay (39)	White	Glennville, GA	
2019-08-21	James Crowe (27)	White	Nicholasville, KY	
2019-08-21	Amari Malone (18)	Black	Fort Worth, TX	
2019-08-21	Jesus Ocasio (54)	Hispanic	North Aurora, IL	
2019-08-21	Luis Hermosillo (50)	Hispanic	Stanton, CA	
2019-08-19	David Patrick Sullivan (18)	White	Fullerton, CA	
2019-08-19	Carlos Torres (39)	Hispanic	Los Angeles, CA	
2019-08-19	Michael Todd Lopez (69)	Hispanic	Nevada (Laughlin)	Lopez was shot and killed by police.
2019-08-19	Roberto Rene Gabriel (33)	Hispanic	California (Los Angeles)	Gabriel was shot and killed by police.
2019-08-18	Jared R. Nelson (38)	White	Wisconsin (Caledonia)	Nelson was shot and killed by police.
2019-08-18	Morales Velasquez (31)	Hispanic	Clearwater, FL	
2019-08-17	Jerome Michael Uzzle (34)	Black	Virginia (Newport News)	Uzzle was shot by a police officer and died 2019-08-18.
2019-08-17	Mike Parsley (62)	White	Indiana (Springville)	Parsley was shot and killed by police.
2019-08-17	Schaston Theodore Lamarr Hodge (27)	Black	Texas (Dallas)	Hodge was shot and killed by police.
2019-08-17	Rashad Cunningham (25)	Black	Indiana (Gary)	Cunningham was shot and killed by police.
2019-08-16	Jovany Mercado-Bedolla (26)	Hispanic	Colorado (Denver)	Mercado-Bedolla was shot and killed by police.
2019-08-16	Collin C. Osborn (38)	Unknown race	Spokane Valley, WA	
2019-08-15	Jose Luis Campos Jr. (41)	Hispanic	Texas (Houston)	
2019-08-15	Jamie Fernandez (31)	Hispanic	Colorado (Denver)	Fernandez was shot and killed by police.
2019-08-14	Anthony Wayne French Sr. (49)	White	Kentucky (Louisville)	Police responded to a domestic violence call at 9:30 p.m. When they arrived, French pointed his gun at the officers. As he was told to drop it, the two officers shot and killed him.
2019-08-14	Thomas Michael Reynolds (37)	Unknown race	South Carolina (Anderson County)	Reynolds was shot and killed by police.
2019-08-14	Neil Bond (33)	Unknown race	Griffin, GA	
2019-08-13	Javaon Ousley (19)	Black	Talladega, AL	
2019-08-13	Jerry "Knot-Knot" Orlando Weaver (51)	Black	Tennessee (Clinton)	Weaver was shot and killed by police.
2019-08-13	Charles Roy Pearson (51)	White	Kansas (Kansas City)	Pearson was shot and killed by police.
2019-08-13	Cole Steele Jessup (20)	White	North Carolina (Randolph County)	Jessup was shot and killed by police.
2019-08-13	David Ingle (31)	White	Missouri (Joplin)	Ingle was shot and killed by police.
2019-08-12	Scott Souders (38)	White	Kansas (Chetopa)	Souders was shot and killed by police.
2019-08-12	Aaron Luther (49)	White	California (Riverside)	Luther was shot and killed by police.
2019-08-11	John Michael George (46)	White	Texas (Fort Worth)	George was shot and killed by police.
2019-08-11	Patrick Sanders (57)	White	Ripley, MS	
2019-08-10	Freddrick Andrews Hadden Jr. (45)	White	Georgia (Augusta)	Hadden was shot and killed by police.
2019-08-10	Manuel Charles Carter (57)	White	Tennessee (Bradley County)	Carter was shot and killed by police.
2019-08-09	Jason Xavier Salas (52)	Hispanic	Texas (Garland)	Salas was shot and killed by police.
2019-08-09	Jose Mendez (37)	Hispanic	Kansas (Kansas City)	Mendez was shot and killed by police officers.
2019-08-09	Mark Johnson (62)	White	Vermont (Montpelier)	Johnson was shot and killed by police officers.
2019-08-09	Name Withheld	Unknown race	Beaumont, CA	
2019-08-08	Christopher Morris (41)	White	Martinsburg, MO	
2019-08-08	Toussaint Diamon Sims (27)	Black	Mississippi (Moss Point)	Sims was shot and killed by police.
2019-08-08	Kevin D. Jenkins (52)	White	Kentucky (Breckinridge County)	Jenkins was shot and killed by police.
2019-08-08	Kaizen Crossen (39)	Black	New Jersey (Irvington)	Crossen was shot and killed by police officers.
2019-08-08	Donald Babbit (49)	White	Pennsylvania (Shaler Township)	Police were initially called for a domestic dispute at the residence. Officers said Babbit ignored police commands to exit the home for more than an hour. When he came out, he was holding a gun and pointed it at police. Three officers, two from Shaler and another from Hampton, fired 10 shots at Babbit, who was hit in the neck, head and trunk. None of the officers who responded were wearing body cameras.
2019-08-07	Detravian Allison (18)	Black	Texas (Longview)	Allison was shot and killed by police.
2019-08-07	Troy Petersen (28)	White	Council Bluffs, IA	
2019-08-06	Brandon C. Jones (39)	White	Grants Pass, OR	
2019-08-05	Riche Antonio Santiago (21)	Hispanic	Utah (Salt Lake City)	Santiago was shot and killed by police officers.
2019-08-05	James Lee Kirkwood (49)	Black	Tennessee (Memphis)	Kirkwood was shot and killed by police.
2019-08-05	Allan George (57)	White	Colorado (Rifle)	George was shot and killed by police.
2019-08-05	Derrick Davidson (56)	White	Arkansas (Lowell)	Davidson was shot and killed by police.
2019-08-05	William Biggs (43)	White	West Virginia (Pocahontas County)	Biggs was shot and killed by police.
2019-08-04	Robert Clay Wilsford Sr. (65)	White	Alabama (Hanceville)	Wilsford was shot and killed by police.
2019-08-04	Oscar Ventura-Gonzalez (32)	Hispanic	Massachusetts (Revere)	Ventura-Gonzalez was shot and killed by police officers.
2019-08-04	Marvin Alexis Urbina (19)	Hispanic	California (Bakersfield)	Urbina was shot and killed by police.
2019-08-04	Connor Stephen Betts (24)	White	Ohio (Dayton)	2019 Dayton shooting
2019-08-03	Aigon Andrew Wallace (25)	Black	Georgia (Loganville)	Wallace was shot and killed by police.
2019-08-03	Cortney Ronald Staley (32)	White	Nevada (Carson City)	Staley was shot and killed by police.
2019-08-03	John Clark (35)	Unknown race	Florida (Safety Harbor)	Clark was shot and killed by police.
2019-08-03	De'Von Bailey (19)	Black	Colorado (Colorado Springs)	Police responded to a robbery about 6:45 p.m. in the 2400 block of East Fountain Boulevard. De'von Bailey, 19, was fatally shot. Police said officers were interviewing two suspects when Bailey "reached for a firearm," according to a sheriff's office news release. At least one officer fired at Bailey. Body cam footage showed Bailey fleeing from the police while reaching for a firearm in his waistband.
2019-08-02	Austin Aaron (14)	White	Jasper, AL	
2019-08-02	Delano Williams (55)	Unknown race	North Carolina (Charlotte)	Williams was shot and killed by police.
2019-08-02	Deshon Downing (45)	Black	Indiana (Indianapolis)	Downing was shot and killed by police.
2019-08-02	Mario Benjamin (32)	Black	Minneapolis, Minnesota	Benjamin had injured his ex-girlfriend and was shot and killed by police officers while holding a gun to his own head.
2019-08-01	Lenny Blane Griffith (48)	White	Florida (Tampa)	
2019-08-01	David. N. Willoughby (54)	White	Kentucky (Jackson County)	Willoughby was shot and killed by police.
2019-08-01	Eric Allen Toon (36)	White	West Virginia (Charleston)	Toon was shot and killed by police.
2019-08-01	Jamaal Michael Simpson (21)	Black	California (Los Angeles)	Simpson was shot and killed by police.
2019-08-01	Rob Schneider (46)		Cincinnati	Rob was shot and killed by Cincinnati police after he pointed a gun at them.
2019-08-01	Margarita "Maggie" Victoria Brooks (30)	White	Texas (Arlington)	Police were called to a welfare check where Brooks was allegedly passed out in a grassy area. When Brooks's dog ran towards the officer, Ravi Singh, he fired, instead hitting Brooks. Singh was later indicted on negligent homicide and was found not guilty in 2022.
2019-08-01	Andre Leach (27)	Unknown race	Pennsylvania (Allentown)	Leach was shot and killed by police.

== See also ==
- Death in custody § United States
- Henry A. Wallace Police Crime Public Database
- List of cases of police brutality
- List of countries with annual rates and counts for killings by law enforcement officers
- List of law enforcement officers killed in the line of duty in the United States
- List of law enforcement officers convicted for an on-duty killing in the United States
- List of shootings by US immigration agents
- List of police reforms related to the George Floyd protests
- List of unarmed African Americans killed by law enforcement officers in the United States
- Lists of killings by law enforcement officers
- Police brutality in the United States
- Police misconduct § United States
- Police riot § United States
- Police use of deadly force in the United States
