= Operation TKO =

2003 probe by the U.S. Drug Enforcement Administration

Operation TKO was a 2003 probe conducted by the U.S. Drug Enforcement Administration (DEA). As a result of Operation TKO, U.S. and Mexican authorities shut down the Mexico City company, Laboratorios Ttokkyo, which was the biggest producer of ketamine in Mexico producing almost 80–90% of the Ketamine found in the United States. This was also the most successful crackdown ever on performance-enhancing drugs. The original goal of the operation was to cut off the supply of ketamine but it led to stopping the production of illegal steroids.,

Subsequently, Ernesto Chevreuil Bravo, 43, a Tijuana veterinary pharmacy owner According to the DEA, over 80% of Ketamine seized in the U.S. is of Mexican origin. The World Health Organization Expert Committee on Drug Dependence, in its thirty third report, recommended research into its recreational use/misuse due to growing concerns about its rising popularity in Europe, Asia and North America. This due in part to its prevention of depression.
