= Excited delirium =

Deprecated syndrome associated with extreme agitation

Excited delirium (ExDS), also known as agitated delirium (AgDS), is a widely rejected pseudoscientific diagnosis characterized as a potentially fatal state of extreme agitation and delirium. It has disproportionately been diagnosed postmortem in black men who were physically restrained by law enforcement personnel at the time of death. Mainstream medicine does not recognise the label as a diagnosis. It is not listed in the Diagnostic and Statistical Manual of Mental Disorders or the International Classification of Diseases, and is not recognized by the World Health Organization, the American Psychiatric Association, the American Medical Association, the American Academy of Emergency Medicine, or the National Association of Medical Examiners.

The American College of Emergency Physicians, which was an outlier in supporting the diagnosis, changed its position in 2023, stating:

The term excited delirium should not be used among the wider medical and public health community, law enforcement organizations, and ACEP members acting as expert witnesses testifying in relevant civil or criminal litigation.

A 2017 investigative report by Reuters found that excited delirium had been listed as a factor in autopsy reports, court records or other sources in at least 276 deaths that followed taser use since 2000. The Taser manufacturing firm Axon published numerous medical studies promoting the diagnosis along with their product.

There have been concerns raised over the use by law enforcement and emergency medical personnel partners to inject sedative drugs, a practice nicknamed "policing by needle", citing claims of excited delirium. The drugs ketamine or midazolam (a benzodiazepine) and haloperidol (an antipsychotic) injected into a muscle have sometimes been used to sedate a person at the discretion of paramedics and sometimes at direct police request. Ketamine can cause respiratory arrest, and in many cases there is no evidence of a medical condition that would justify its use. The term excited delirium is sometimes used interchangeably with acute behavioural disturbance, a symptom of a number of conditions which is also responded to with involuntary injection with benzodiazepines, antipsychotics, or ketamine.

A 2020 investigation by the United Kingdom Forensic Science Regulator found that the diagnosis should not have been used since it "has been applied in some cases where other important pathological mechanisms, such as positional asphyxia and trauma may have been more appropriate". In the U.S., neurologists writing for the Brookings Institution called it "a misappropriation of medical terminology, used by law enforcement to legitimize police brutality and to retroactively explain certain deaths occurring in police custody". The American Psychiatric Association's position is that the term "is too non-specific to meaningfully describe and convey information about a person." The Royal College of Psychiatrists has deprecated use of excited delirium, recommending non-diagnostic descriptions for highly agitated states such as acute behavioral disturbance.

== History ==
Throughout the 19th and early-20th century, "excited delirium" was used to describe an emotional and agitated state related to drug overdose and withdrawal or poisonings, similar to catatonia or Bell's mania, with some believing them to be the same condition.

In 1985, an article titled "Cocaine-induced psychosis and sudden death in recreational cocaine users", co-authored by Dade County deputy chief medical examiner Charles Victor Wetli was published in the Journal of Forensic Sciences. The article describes a state of "excited delirium" in cocaine users leading to respiratory collapse and death, despite the people having blood concentrations of cocaine ten times lower than those seen in fatal overdoses. In five of the seven cases presented in the article, the deaths occurred while in police custody. In 1988, Wetli claimed that a series of nineteen women, all Black prostitutes, had died of excited delirium due to "sexual excitement" while under the influence of cocaine. Police later announced they had found a serial killer, Charles Henry Williams, responsible for those deaths.

By the 1990s, the term "excited delirium" (ExDS) began to be used as a diagnosis to explain deaths in police custody especially during or after restraint, particularly in Florida. Despite the increasing usage of "excited delirium" in the 1990s by some medical examiners and police, mainstream medical associations refused to recognize the legitimacy of the purported syndrome, and it was never listed in the Diagnostic and Statistical Manual of Mental Disorders (DSM). In the early 2000s, medical commentators noted that excited delirium was used disproportionately against African Americans, and alleged that police often used it to cover up deaths resulting from police brutality while in custody.

=== Rejection by experts ===
Excited delirium is not recognized by the World Health Organization, the American Psychiatric Association, the American Medical Association, and not listed as a medical condition in the Diagnostic and Statistical Manual of Mental Disorders or International Classification of Diseases. Dr. Michael Baden, a specialist in investigating deaths in custody, describes excited delirium as "a boutique kind of diagnosis created, unfortunately, by many of my forensic pathology colleagues specifically for persons dying when being restrained by law enforcement". In June 2021, the Royal College of Psychiatrists in the UK released a statement that they do "not support the use of such terminology [as ExDS or AgDS], which has no empirical evidential basis" and said "the use of these terms is, in effect, racial discrimination".

A 2020 scientific literature review looked at reported cases of excited delirium and agitated delirium. The authors noted that most published current information has indicated that excited delirium-related deaths are due to an occult pathophysiologic process. A database of cases was created which included the use of force, drug intoxication, mental illness, demographics, and survival outcome. A review of cases revealed there was no evidence to support ExDS as a cause of death in the absence of restraint. The authors found that when death occurred in an aggressively restrained individual that fits the profile of either ExDS or AgDS, restraint-related asphyxia must be considered the more likely cause of the death.

=== Position of the American College of Emergency Physicians ===
Prior to 2009, excited delirium was only recognized by medical examiners, not physicians. However, in 2009, a 19-person task force from American College of Emergency Physicians (ACEP) wrote a white paper suggesting that excited delirium should be considered as a valid syndrome, which physicians can use for diagnoses. This suggestion was adopted by the ACEP later in 2009.

In 2017, investigative reporters from Reuters reported that three of the 19 members of the 2009 task force were paid consultants for Axon, the manufacturer of Tasers. (Note: The three members of the task force that were consultants for the Taser manufacturer were Deborah Mash, Charles Wetli and Jeffrey Ho.) Axon frequently blames excited delirium for stun-gun-related deaths.

In 2020, the American Psychiatric Association expressed concern about the ACEP's adoption of excited delirium as a genuine syndrome, due to factors such as disproportionate application to African-Americans:

The concept of "excited delirium" (also referred to as "excited delirium syndrome" (ExDs)) has been invoked in a number of cases to explain or justify injury or death to individuals in police custody, and the term excited delirium is disproportionately applied to Black men in police custody. Although the American College of Emergency Physicians has explicitly recognized excited delirium as a medical condition, the criteria are unclear and to date there have been no rigorous studies validating excited delirium as a medical diagnosis.

In 2021, the ACEP created a new task force to reevaluate the excited delirium syndrome. As a result, in 2023 the ACEP withdrew the 2009 white paper, which defined the syndrome, and instead endorsed a new syndrome "hyperactive delirium syndrome with severe agitation". In a statement, the ACEP said it had "withdrawn its approval of this [the 2009] paper" and that "[t]he term excited delirium should not be used among the wider medical and public health community, law enforcement organizations, and ACEP members acting as expert witnesses testifying in relevant civil or criminal litigation".

The 2021 ACEP report was criticized by some physicians for failing to sufficiently consider racial bias, similar to the 2009 report:

Absent from the 2009 and 2021 reports is a substantive discussion of the potential inequitable application of the diagnosis of ExD to Black individuals, and especially Black men while in police custody or under the care of emergency medical services (EMS) care.... In contrast with the ACEP reports, the popular press has directed increasing attention to the issue of bias and ExD. News reports critically examined the concept of ExD, including racial aspects, after the diagnosis of ExD was advanced by the legal defense team and the police to explain the deaths of George Floyd and Elijah McClain, respectively.

Mainstream medical organizations continued to withhold recognition of either the old syndrome or new syndrome, due to the absence of scientific rigor or evidence.

In 2023, the state of California became the first in the United States to ban the use of excited delirium as a cause of death.

== Controversy ==
=== Association with racism ===
In 2003, the NAACP argued that excited delirium is used to explain the deaths of minorities more often than whites, and the American Psychiatric Association also notes that "the term excited delirium is disproportionately applied to Black men in police custody". The American Civil Liberties Union argued in 2007 that the diagnosis served "as a means of white-washing what may be excessive use of force and inappropriate use of control techniques by officers during an arrest."

Several academic commentators have noted that medical personnel and law enforcement personnel apply diagnoses of excited delirium in a manner which disproportionately disadvantages African Americans. Excited delirium has also been used to diagnose Indigenous people after violent police encounters. In 1999, in Victoria British Columbia, Canada, Anthany Dawson, a member of the Musgamagw Tsawataineuk Nation, was beaten and punched repeatedly by the police before dying in an ambulance. Initially, police statements relayed to the public that overdose was his cause of death, though there was no evidence of drug use at the time of the statements’ release. Later, toxicology reports only found a small amount of marijuana from the previous evening before his death. In the media, Dawson was portrayed as having been mentally ill, but he had no medical history of mental illness. Then, he was believed to have a genetic condition that predisposed him to die of excited delirium which was the documented cause of his death. Dawson's mother, however, maintains that "police force and racism" was the sole cause of her son’s death. By presenting these unfounded individual causes for Dawson’s death, police violence cannot be named as the causal factor in his life ending.

In addition, commentators have alleged that fallacious diagnoses of excited delirium have been used to cover-up instances of police brutality. Excited delirium’s diagnosis serves to cover the racial injustice of police brutality and structural racism, pinning the blame on the victim. By painting the victims in police reports as menacing, unpredictable, and uncontrollable under the pretence of being mentally ill, or under influence of substances, police aggression is not only excused, it is justified. Rather than enacting empathy and compassion for people in vulnerable situations, the police create a dehumanizing narrative wherein the victims’ death is inevitable, where their life reaches a prescribed end.Police procedures and behaviours, their tendency to escalate force and gross neglect goes unexamined and unquestioned. Ultimately, it removes moral culpability and accountability from the police and leaves the victims’ families and communities without justice nor a proper account of their loved ones’ death.

Excited delirium has been described as fundamentally racist by many commentators in the media, including Jon Ronson's BBC podcast Things Fell Apart in 2024. The episode, titled "The Most Mysterious Deaths", describes Wetli's initial coining of the phrase "excited delirium", as well as the later debunking of the phenomenon, and its connection to the murder of George Floyd.

Before the term "excited delirium" was rejected by the ACEP in 2023, its supposed risk factors vary including "bizarre behavior generating phone calls to police", "failure to respond to police presence", and "continued struggle despite restraint". It supposedly endows individuals with "superhuman strength" and being "impervious to pain". It is disproportionately diagnosed among young Black men, and has clear undertones of racial bias.

=== Influence of Taser manufacturer ===
Axon Enterprise, formerly Taser International, provides training for police on recognizing excited delirium and several prominent proponents of the diagnosis are retained by Axon, with diagnosis often based on a test conducted by Deborah Mash, a paid consultant to Axon. A 2017 report by Reuters found that excited delirium had been listed as a factor in autopsy reports, court records or other sources in at least 276 deaths that followed taser use since 2000, with diagnosis often based on a test conducted by Deborah Mash. In one case, within four hours of a man dying after being tasered, Axon had provided model press releases, instructions for gathering evidence of excited delirium, and advised that samples be sent to Mash.

Axon has paid thousands of dollars to proponents of the excited delirium diagnosis, including Charles Wetli who first proposed the term, who have repeatedly used "excited delirium" as a defense in liability suits and to shield police officers from criminal liability for deaths in custody.

Axon has instigated litigation against some medical examiners who suggested that tasers were a factor in the death of restrained persons. Scholars have speculated that this may have a chilling effect on the reports published by some medical examiners. A survey in 2011 showed that 14% of medical examiners had altered a diagnostic finding "out of fear of litigation by the company".

In Canada, the 2007 case of Robert Dziekanski received national attention and placed a spotlight on the use of tasers in police actions and the diagnosis of excited delirium. Police psychologist Mike Webster testified at a British Columbia inquiry into taser deaths that police have been "brainwashed" by Taser International to justify "ridiculously inappropriate" use of the electric weapon. He called excited delirium a "dubious disorder" used by Taser International in its training of police. In a 2008 report, the Royal Canadian Mounted Police argued that excited delirium should not be included in the operational manual for the Royal Canadian Mounted Police without formal approval after consultation with a mental-health-policy advisory body.

=== Association with police restraint ===
Amnesty International found that the syndrome was cited in 75 of the 330 deaths following police use of a taser on suspects between 2001 and 2008, and a Florida-based study found it was listed as a cause of death in over half of all deaths in police custody, though many Florida districts do not use it at all.

According to an article in the Harvard Civil Rights–Civil Liberties Law Review, since 2000, over one thousand people in the United States have died shortly after being tased, with the deaths sharing several commonalities: "the deceased often were mentally ill or under the influence of drugs at the time of death, they tend to have been shocked multiple times by officers during arrest, and they often share an exceptionally rare cause of death, 'excited delirium.'"

While diagnosis is habitually of men under police restraint, medical preconditions and symptoms attributed to the syndrome are far more varied.

Males account for more documented diagnoses than females. Often law enforcement has used tasers or physical measures in these cases, and death most frequently occurs after the person is forcefully restrained. Critics of excited delirium have stated that the condition is primarily attributed to deaths while in the custody of law enforcement and is disproportionately applied to Black and Hispanic victims. One study looking at cocaine-related deaths in the 1970s and 1980s in Florida, showed that the deaths were more likely to be diagnosed as excited delirium when involving young Black men dying in police custody and "accidental cocaine toxicity" when involving white people. A 1998 study found that "In all 21 cases of unexpected death associated with excited delirium, the deaths were associated with restraint (for violent agitation and hyperactivity), with the person either in a prone position (18 people [86%]) or subjected to pressure on the neck (3 [14%]). All of those who died had suddenly lapsed into tranquillity shortly after being restrained".

The UK Independent Advisory Panel on Deaths in Custody (IAP) suggests that the syndrome should be termed "Sudden death in restraint syndrome" in order to enhance clarity. Some civil-rights groups have argued that excited delirium diagnoses are being used to absolve law enforcement of guilt in cases where alleged excessive force may have contributed to patient deaths.

Prominent cases include Daniel Prude, who was said to be in a state of excited delirium in 2020 when police put a hood over his head and pressed his naked body against the pavement. Prude, a Black man, lost consciousness and died. Excited delirium was also cited by the defense in State v. Chauvin, a murder trial related to the murder of George Floyd in 2020. Prosecutor Steve Schleicher refuted the defense suggestion that Floyd had "superhuman strength" during his arrest because he was suffering from the condition.

=== Ketamine use ===
Ketamine or midazolam and haloperidol injected into a muscle have frequently been used, sometimes at direct police request, to sedate people alleged to be experiencing excited delirium. Ketamine can cause respiratory arrest, and in many cases there is no evidence of a medical condition that would justify its use. Following an injection the person must be transported to a hospital. In 2018, a Minneapolis hospital published a paper which reported that 57 percent of the people who had been injected for agitation needed intubation.

Concern has been raised about the increasing usage of a claim of excited delirium to justify tranquilizing persons during arrest, with requests for tranquilization often being made by law enforcement rather than medical professionals. Ketamine is the most commonly used drug in these cases. There have been deaths related to use of ketamine on restrained prisoners. A controversial study into ketamine use was terminated due to ethics concerns. The study was also linked to Axon via Jeffrey Ho.

In 2019, Elijah McClain, a Black man, was arrested by police officers after receiving a 911 call which reported a man walking, waving his arms and wearing a ski mask. The officers said that he was exhibiting "crazy strength" when they attempted to arrest him but all three said that their body cams had fallen off and thus there was no video of what they claimed to be a violent struggle. McClain weighed 140 pounds and was 5 feet 6 inches tall. He was handcuffed and then a choke hold was used twice, once "successfully" meaning that McClain lost consciousness. When paramedics arrived they administered enough ketamine to sedate a 220-pound man. He went into cardiac arrest a few minutes later. In a report of the case on 60 Minutes, John Dickerson interviewed the District Attorney who justified the use of ketamine, adding that since excited delirium could not be ruled out as a cause of death it would be impossible to win a homicide case because "you can't file a homicide charge without cause of death."

== See also ==
- Positional asphyxia
- Stimulant psychosis
- Taser safety issues
- Drapetomania
