= Journal of Forensic and Legal Medicine =

- Discipline: Forensic medicine, legal medicine
- Language: English
- Edited by: Michael Freeman

Publication details
- Former names: Police Surgeon, Journal of Clinical Forensic Medicine
- History: 1972–present
- Publisher: Elsevier
- Frequency: 8/year
- Impact factor: 1.7 (2025)

Standard abbreviations
- ISO 4: J. Forensic Leg. Med.

Indexing
- ISSN: 1752-928X (print); 1878-7487 (web)
- LCCN: 2007212989
- OCLC no.: 612913525

Links
- Journal homepage; Online access; Online archive

The Journal of Forensic and Legal Medicine is a peer-reviewed medical journal covering forensic and legal medicine. It was established in 1972 as the Police Surgeon, obtaining its current name in 2007. It is published by Elsevier on behalf of the Faculty of Forensic and Legal Medicine, of which it is the official journal. As of 2026, the editor-in-chief was Michael Freeman. According to the Journal Citation Reports, the journal has a 2025 impact factor of 1.7.
