= Community Memorial Hospital of San Buenaventura =

Coordinates: 34°16′28″N 119°15′29″W

- Community Memorial Health System
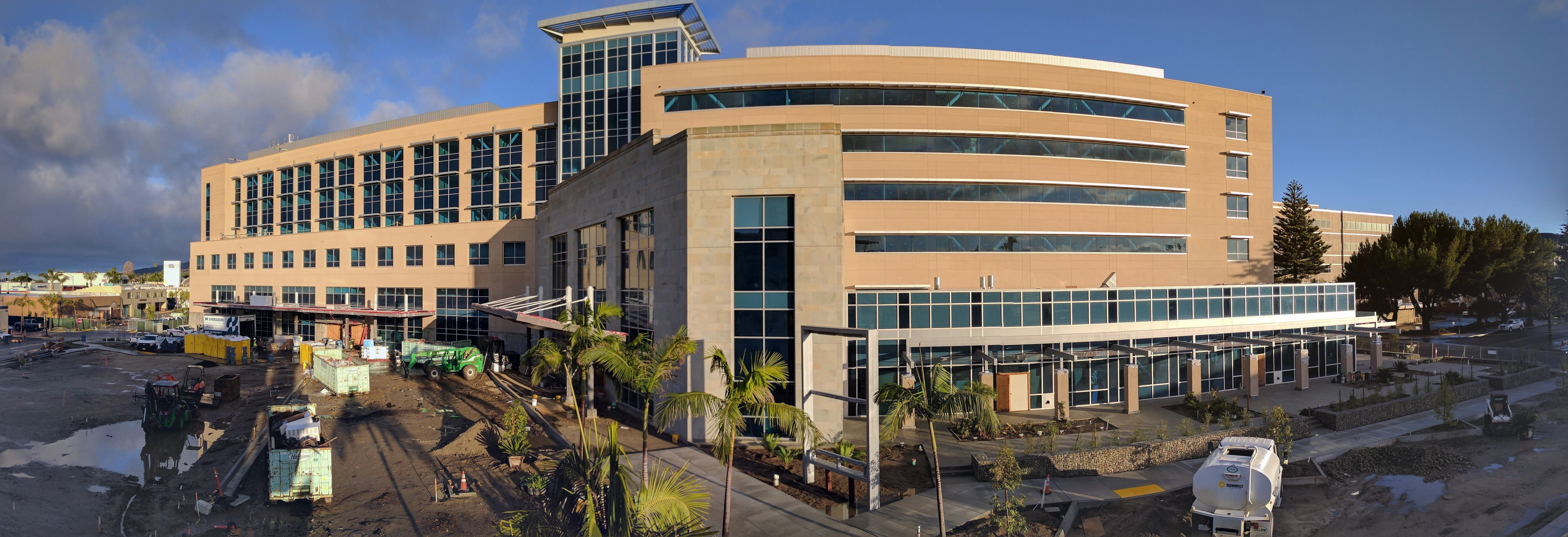
- New hospital building under construction (January 2017)

Geography
- Location: 147 North Brent Street, Ventura, California, United States

Organization
- Care system: Private, Non-profit
- Type: Community, Teaching
- Affiliated university: None

Services
- Beds: 242
- Helipad: yes

History
- Opened: 1901

Links
- Website: www.cmhshealth.org
- Lists: Hospitals in California

Community Memorial Hospital of San Buenaventura is a 242-bed community-based teaching hospital located in Ventura, California. The hospital is accredited by the Joint Commission. In the most recent year with available data, 38,013 patients visited the emergency department, 13,314 patients were admitted to the hospital, and physicians performed 4,133 inpatient and 7,151 outpatient surgeries.

Community Memorial Hospital started as a single hospital in 1901. Today it has grown into an expansive healthcare system with two hospitals and eleven family practice centers serving various communities in the Ventura County area.

Community Memorial Hospital has begun building a new six-story, 325,000-square-foot (30,200 m^{2}) hospital next to the current location. The new building was scheduled to open in 2015, but is now expected to open in December 2018, and will have 250 private rooms.

== Medical education ==
Community Memorial Hospital operates a number of residency programs that train newly graduated physicians. Programs include family medicine, internal medicine, and orthopedic surgery, general surgery and psychiatry residencies.
