= Medicine, Science and the Law =

- Discipline: Forensic medicine, legal medicine, forensic science
- Language: English
- Edited by: Peter Vanezis

Publication details
- History: 1960-present
- Publisher: SAGE Publications
- Frequency: Quarterly
- Impact factor: 0.689

Standard abbreviations
- ISO 4: Med. Sci. Law

Indexing
- CODEN: MDSLA6
- ISSN: 0025-8024 (print); 2042-1818 (web)
- LCCN: 65001593
- OCLC no.: 985537463

Links
- Journal homepage; Online access; Online archive

Medicine, Science and the Law is a quarterly peer-reviewed medical journal covering forensic medicine and science. It was established in 1960 and was originally published by Sweet & Maxwell; it is now published by SAGE Publications. It has been the official journal of the British Academy of Forensic Sciences since the journal and Academy were both established. The editor-in-chief is Peter Vanezis (Barts and The London School of Medicine and Dentistry). According to the Journal Citation Reports, the journal has a 2016 impact factor of 0.689, ranking it 90th out of 147 journals in the category "Law" and 12th out of 15 journals in the category "Medicine, Legal".
