= Stay Woke: The Black Lives Matter Movement =

2016 television documentary film

- Directed by: Laurens Grant
- Starring: Jesse Williams; Alicia Garza; Patrisse Cullors; DeRay Mckesson; Johnetta Elzie; Darnell L. Moore; Michaela Angela Davis; Brittany Packnett
- Country of origin: United States
- Original language: English

Original release
- Network: BET
- Release: May 26, 2016

Stay Woke: The Black Lives Matter Movement is a 2016 American television documentary film starring Jesse Williams about the Black Lives Matter movement, and the events that led to the uprising of the movement. The phrase "stay woke" refers to a continuing awareness of issues concerning social justice and racial justice and came to widespread use as a result of Black Lives Matter. The "Stay Woke" documentary gives a deeper understanding to how the movement came to be and what the movement believes.

The film debuted on BET on May 26, 2016.

== Summary ==
The film opens up with sharing the voice recording of the night that Trayvon Martin was killed by George Zimmerman. The documentary shows how the #blacklivesmatter hashtag came into effect on social media and how the movement rose up. In the documentary, other incidents where injustice was shown is displayed throughout the film. The "Stay Woke" documentary shows the cry for justice as a result of several instances of police brutality. "Stay Woke" digs deep into the movement of Black Lives Matter and everything that this movement represents.

== Black Lives Matter ==
The Black Lives Matter movement started in 2013 after the uproar over the killing of Michael Brown in Ferguson, MO. The movement started out with the goal of connecting African-Americans who share a similar battle with racism and injustice. Black Lives Matter frequently holds protests centered around issues such as police brutality, racial inequality, and racial profiling.
