= Resistance Manual =

The Resistance Manual was a Wiki-style site till 2019 that crowdsourced information and resources. It was created by the activists Samuel Sinyangwe, DeRay McKesson, Johnetta Elzie, Brittany Packnett and law student Aditi Juneja. The manual includes information on policy areas such as immigration, policing, mass incarceration and disability rights, and it tracks Trump's executive orders and various controversies including Russian interference in the 2016 United States elections during the election. In the days since it was launched, the manual had over 400 pieces of content contributed to it from users, and was featured in NBC News, Huffington Post, MSNBC, International Business Times, The Fader and as one of Teen Vogue's "10 Ways to Continue The Fight for Women's Rights".
