= Deray =

Deray is both a given name and a surname. Notable people with the name include:

- DeRaye Miller (born 1976), American singer, artist and Human Resources Coordinator
- DeRay Davis (born 1982), American stand-up comedian and actor
- DeRay Mckesson (born 1985), American civil rights activist
- Jacques Deray (1929–2003), French film director and screenwriter
