= Benjamin Hansen =

Benjamin Hansen may refer to:

- Benjamin Hansen (footballer) (born 1994), Danish footballer
- Benjamin Hansen (economist), American economist

== See also ==
- Ben W. Hanson, member of the North Dakota House of Representatives
