= Police body camera =

Wearable recording system

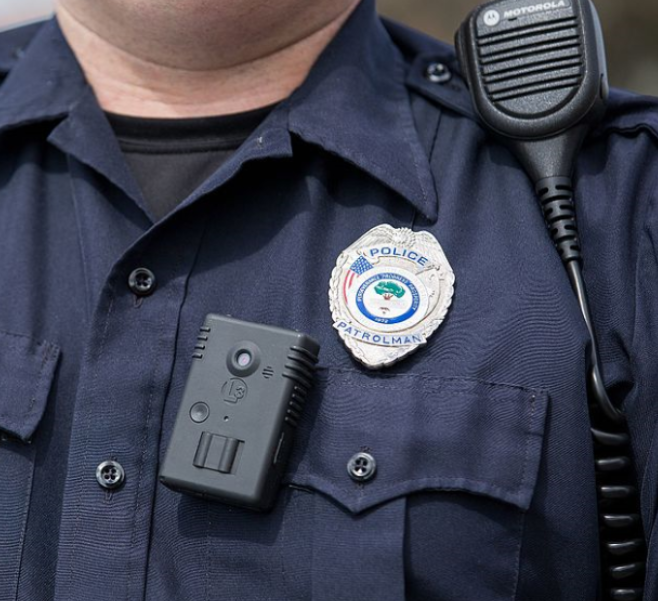
A police officer wearing a body camera on his uniform

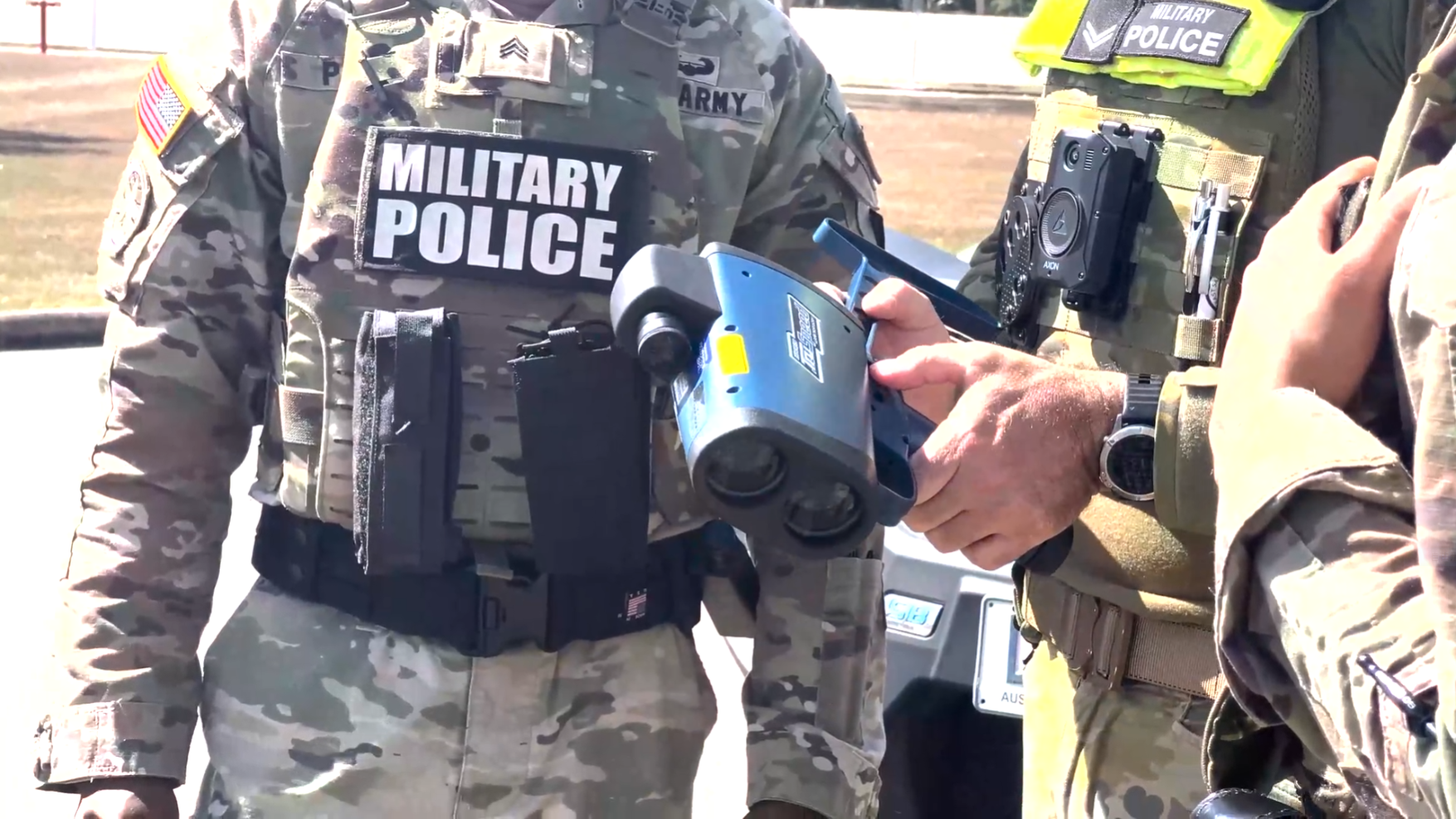
Australian Defence Force military police officer wearing body camera during Talisman Sabre exercise

In policing equipment, a police body camera or wearable camera, also known as body worn video (BWV), body-worn camera (BWC), or body camera, is a wearable audio, video, or photographic recording system used by police to record events in which law enforcement officers are involved, from the perspective of the officer wearing it. They are typically worn on the torso of the body, pinned on the officer's uniform, on a pair of sunglasses, a shoulder lapel, or a hat.

Police body cameras are often similar to body cameras used by civilians, firefighters, or the military, but are designed to address specific requirements related to law enforcement. Body cameras are used by law enforcement to record public interactions and gather video evidence at crime scenes. Current body cameras are much lighter and smaller than the first experiments with wearable cameras in the late 1990s. There are several types of body cameras made by different manufacturers. Each camera serves the same purpose, yet some function in slightly different ways or have to be worn in a specific way. Police in the United Kingdom first began wearing body cameras in 2005, which have since been adopted by numerous police departments and forces worldwide.

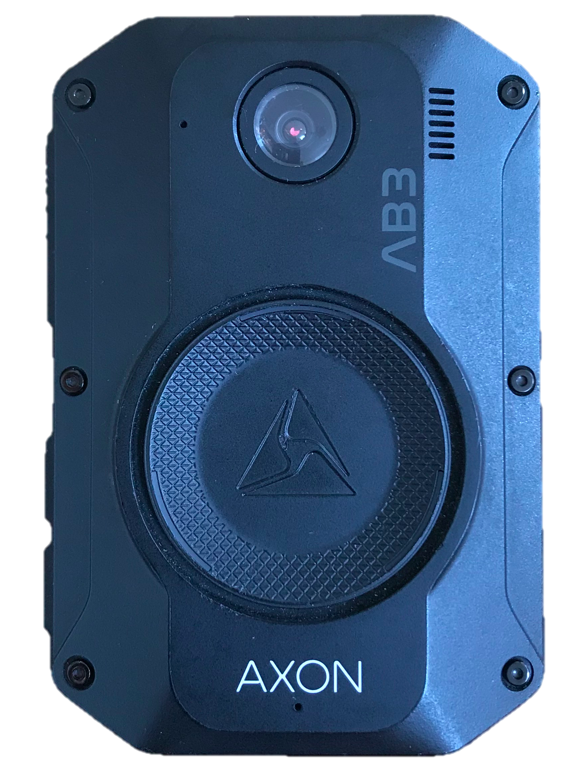
An example of a modern body camera designed for police use

Many body cameras offer specific features like HD quality, infrared, night vision, fisheye lenses, or varying degrees of view. Other features specific to law enforcement are implemented in the hardware to integrate the body cameras with other devices or wearables. Another example is automatic triggers that start recording when the officer initiates a specific procedure, such as when a firearm or taser is drawn from a holster, when a siren is activated, or when the car door opens.

== Usage support ==
With 88% of Americans and 95% of Dutch people supporting body cameras on police officers, there is strong public support for this technology. However, not all civilians are necessarily aware of the presence of bodycams. A study in Milwaukee revealed that awareness of the bodycams was comparatively low in the first year following implementation (36%) but increased after two more years (76%). In that study, respondents were asked whether they thought bodycams would improve relationships between the police and community members: 84 percent (strongly) agreed. An even larger proportion, 87 percent, (strongly) agreed that Body-Worn Cameras would hold Milwaukee police officers accountable for their behaviors. These percentages hardly changed in the three years following introduction, which suggests that opinions such as these are independent of awareness of bodycams. According to findings in criminology, body-worn cameras have been shown to improve citizens reactions to police encounters.

All costs and benefits, including indirect costs and benefits, have to be weighed against each other in a cost-benefit analysis, to be able to judge whether body cameras lead to a positive or negative business case. The police in Kent, United Kingdom, predicted a positive business case within two years after their investment of £1.8 million in body cameras, purely because of a reduction in the number of complaints.

Across various countries, but particularly in the United States, police body cameras have shown the potential to reduce complaints and enhance police officer accountability, although their effectiveness remains debatable.

In 2019, a team of researchers published the most comprehensive overview to date of the impact of BWCs. They based their overview on seventy empirical studies, most from U.S. jurisdictions (74%). The study reports on officer behavior, officer perceptions, citizen behavior, citizen perceptions, police investigations, and police organizations. Subsequent analysis of the research affirms their mixed findings about BWCs' effectiveness and draws attention to how the design of many evaluations fails to account for local contextual considerations or citizen perspectives, particularly among groups that disproportionately experience police violence.

=== Civilian behavior ===
Police body cameras have been cited in resulting in increased levels of compliance by civilians and lowered levels of complaints in relation to policing in their neighborhoods. At least 16 studies were aimed at examining the Impact of BWCs on civilian behavior. This can be measured by compliance with the police, willingness to call the police, willingness to cooperate in investigations or crime and disorder when an officer is present. The results were varied and some aspects have not been studied at all, for instance the concern that BWCs may reduce people's willingness to call the police due to worries about personal privacy.

==== Civilian perception ====
One study found that when looking at support for BWCs race, ethnicity, differing neighborhoods, and other demographics had an effect on support for BWCs. Another study found that race, gender, and police accountability had a significant impact on the concerns of citizens opinions of the release of BWC footage. A nationwide study found that the public is enthused about the potential for BWCs to improve transparency in police work. However, within the same study it was found that there was less agreement in terms of whether BWCs can impact trust in policing or improve police–citizen relationships.

=== Officer behavior ===
Body camera footage from a deputy of the Martin County Sheriff's Office in Florida of the arrest of Ryan Routh, a man who attempted to assassinate then-former U.S. president Donald Trump on September 15, 2024

Impact on officer behavior is measured by complaints, use of force reports, arrests/citations or proactive behaviors. A study regarding the impact of police body cameras came to the conclusion that these cameras have a proven link to a decrease in complaints regarding use of excessive force and misconduct of police officers. The University of Las Vegas Nevada's (UNLV) Center for Crime and Justice Policy and the Las Vegas Metropolitan Police Department (LVMPD) carried out this study. The study found that police body cameras could also result in various reduced costs as a result of simplifying the processes from when a complaint is made to when it is addressed. The study, which was funded by the U.S. Department of Justice, overall found that police body cameras can improve police and community relations, reduce misconduct complaints, use of excessive force by police, and provide significant cost savings in relation to court costs. Conducted with approximately 400 Las Vegas police officers, the study's trial showed that officers wearing cameras had 30% fewer misconduct complaints and 37% fewer incidents with excessive force, compared to smaller or increased rates in the control group. The use of police body cameras also led to an 8% increase in citations and a 6% rise in arrests. Despite annual costs ranging from $828 to $1,097 per officer, the technology apparently saved over $4,000 per officer annually by reducing complaint investigations.

A 2018 report by the Bureau of Justice Statistics explained that the main reasons for the adoption of police body cameras by police departments was mainly to improve the safety of officers, to increase the quality of evidence that was gathered, and to reduce complaints made by civilians. Research from this report has shown that there are mixed results regarding how effective police body cameras are in achieving these goals. The report's review of around 70 studies showed that there were no consistent or significant impacts on issues such as the use of force (in relation to civilian complaints), officer safety, and more. This essentially concluded that police body cameras effectively had “no effect” on various aspects of police behavior.

==== Officer perception ====
At least 32 studies focused on officer attitudes about cameras. First of all, the authors describe the methodological challenges of many of these studies. Despite those issues and despite mixed findings, one consistent theme is that once officers start using cameras, they feel positive or become more positive about BWCs.

==== Police investigations ====
This aspect consists of criminal investigations, crime resolution, intelligence gathering or court proceedings and outcomes. Prosecutors rarely bring cases against the police and it remains to be seen whether this will change much as a result of BWCs. Empirical results are hard to find. Three studies (all from the UK) revealed positive outcomes: officers can pursue prosecution even without victim cooperation and cases may more likely be charged.

==== Police organizations ====
This is about training, policies, accountability, supervision et cetera. It is the least researched area, with some exceptions. Technologies often have unintended consequences on police. Much more research is needed to understand whether BWC footage can help officers to learn skills better and whether that in turn has an impact on their actual behavior. BWCs can - in theory - strengthen the accountability structure in an organization, but perhaps not if existing accountability mechanisms in the agency are weak. BWCs for instance will unlikely improve mentorship or supervision in an agency that does not value such mentorship or supervision.

=== Legal implications ===
Body cameras have been shown to be valuable in legal processes, especially in securing quick guilty pleas for lower-level offenses. Footage that is obtained from police body cameras is captured from the officer's perspective, which can allow for prosecutors to have indisputable evidence against individuals that are involved in lower-level offenses such as traffic violations and trespassing. This results in less cases going to trial as the concrete evidence provided by the cameras can make a plea deal the only reasonable option left for a defendant. Early research considering the effects of both police body worn cameras and bystander smartphone footage included Karl T. Muth and Nancy Jack's research on body cameras in 2015 (published in spring 2016), written at a time when body worn cameras were unpopular among officers and policing organizations were challenging bystanders' right to record officers: "Here, we argue that if employers may record their employees, then people, as employers of the police, likewise should be able to record the police when in public."

=== Storage ===
Features such as cloud storage have been trialed and implemented into the cameras and the data-storage process. Axon allows sharing footage outside the police department, for instance with district attorneys, other prosecutors or the courts.

Video content analysis, such as facial recognition or automatic indexing of recordings to simplify search, can help to reduce the time needed to find relevant fragments in recorded data that would otherwise be overwhelming.

== Usage concerns ==
While body cameras aim to increase transparency and accountability, they have also sparked debates over privacy and effectiveness. There is concern about the privacy of the people being filmed (suspects, victims, witnesses) but also about that of the officers wearing the cameras or the officers whose actions are recorded by their colleagues.

=== Capabilities ===
Ever since body cameras were introduced, there has been a debate over whether capabilities that make the camera superior to that of the officer's eyes should be allowed. For instance, infra-red recordings could in hindsight clearly show that a suspect did or did not carry a gun in his hand, but the officer at the scene may not have been able to see this. This issue forces companies to choose whether to incorporate 'super human' features, or not. Body cameras are able to record for up to 12 hours. If a law enforcement officer turns on their body camera at the beginning of their shift, they are able to record footage for the entire duration of the shift.

Another important feature in law-enforcement body cameras is buffering: the option to let a body camera 'pre-record'. The bodycam can record continuously and store video from the previous thirty seconds, for example. If the officer presses the record switch, the preceding thirty seconds of recording will be kept. The ability to buffer enables officers to retain video of everything that occurred prior to the moment the record switch was pressed. This buffered video and audio may provide more context to an incident. If the recording doesn't start, the video will be deleted after thirty seconds have elapsed on a 'first in, first out' basis. HD resolution improves usability of recordings as evidence, but at the same time increases file size, which in turn leads to an increase in bandwidth requirements for data transfer and storage capacity. At present, HD is the industries' standard, but until roughly 2016 that was not the case even though the technology was widely available in other devices.

=== Facial recognition ===
One possibility is that a police officer wearing this technology could become a 'roving surveillance camera'. If the bodycams are equipped with biometric facial recognition technology, this could have a major impact on people's everyday lives, depending on the reliability of the technology to prevent false positives (those that are mistaken for a person on a list of suspects, for instance). Furthermore, cameras equipped with facial recognition technology heighten worries over “secret surveillance at a distance”. Information about civilian whereabouts can consistently be tracked if they appear in public and it happens without their knowledge. There are more concerns about the advancement of these facial recognition technologies in body cams and the lack of government regulation over them. Particular concerns have been noted with respect to the use of cameras equipped with facial recognition at public protests. It has been suggested that such camera use may "chill" rights of free speech and association.

In the United States, there are 117 million Americans in the FBI's shared database according to the Georgetown Report. People can become fearful of the police's ability to identify them in public and gather information about where they've been and where they might be going. In the US, there is no federal law in place that directly protects Americans when it comes to the use of facial recognition technology. Only the states of Illinois and Texas have regulations, "that require(s) an individual to give consent for their biometrics to be used, protecting its application in a system that it was not originally intended for".

=== Consent ===
In the context of recording, the biggest issues arise from whether consent from parties involved is required before starting a recording. The nature of police work has officers interacting with civilians and suspects during their most vulnerable moments, such as those in the hospital, or domestic violence cases. There is also a threat of people not coming forward with tips for fear of being recorded. In terms of the police officer's private contexts, they may forget to turn off cameras in the bathroom or in private conversations. These situations should be considered as the technology is developed further and the use of it is becoming more saturated. In the U.S. federal and individual states have varying statutes regarding consent laws.

In regards to consent there are also the concerns in regards to the bystanders around the scene of the crime, when an officer approaches a crime or a largely crowded scene they are not asking each person there for consent to be recorded. Which can cause an issue for the police department and law enforcement because the officer could be held accountable for not asking for consent and in a case where they are just walking by the scene they are not involved in what is taking place, so there is no need for them to be in the body camera footage.

=== Search and seizure ===
Another major concern that has arisen since the implementation of police body cameras is how these technologies will affect the privacy rights of individuals in regards to search and seizure laws. The 1967 Supreme Court case Katz v. United States determined that “there need not be a physical or technical trespass to constitute a search or seizure deserving of constitutional protection.” Extraction of sensitive information from individuals through electronic transmission is deemed to be unconstitutional under the Fourth Amendment. Police body camera recordings conducted on private property without a warrant or probable cause are expected to violate the individual search and seizure rights of the property owner. Video recordings conducted in public spaces aren't generally subject to Fourth Amendment protections under the “plain view” doctrine developed by the Supreme Court. In these circumstances an officer can record an individual and their actions as long as they are in public spaces. Many other nations have their own search and seizure laws that have specific implications associated with the use of body cameras worn on police officers.

=== Usage inconsistencies ===
Throughout police departments in the United States or even worldwide there is an inconsistency from one police department to the next, some have body cameras while others may not which makes the use of body cameras difficult. Using data from the 2013 Law Enforcement Management and Administrative Survey (LEMAS). After the increase in high-profile lethal incidents throughout the United States, more police agencies have mandated that officers have to wear body cameras. According to the research they found that agencies with large operating budgets and agencies with collective bargaining units are less likely to use body cameras in their police force. Body cameras are helpful to have extra eyes at the scene and to see what is happening from another point of view, however if not all police departments are using them then they are not holding officers accountable or helping victims of police brutality show the true story of what happened. Body cameras could be more beneficial and useful if they were mandatory over all police departments.

=== Pricing ===
Body cameras require sizable investments. In 2012, the price of the camera itself was between $120 and $1,000, according to a market survey by the United States Department of Justice in which seven suppliers were compared. A more recent market survey in 2016, describing 66 body cameras of 38 different vendors, showed that the average price (or actually: the average manufacturer's suggested retail prices) was $570, with a minimum of $199 and a maximum of $2,000. In 2017, based on information from 45 police forces in the United Kingdom, research showed that nearly 48,000 body cameras had been purchased and that £22,703,235 had been spent on the cameras. Dividing this total by the number of cameras gives an estimate of the average costs per camera: £474. The minimum was £348 for the Police Service of Northern Ireland and the maximum was £705 for the Metropolitan Police Service. These differences may be partly attributable to the fact that some forces have included more types of costs than other forces.

==== 'Hidden' costs ====
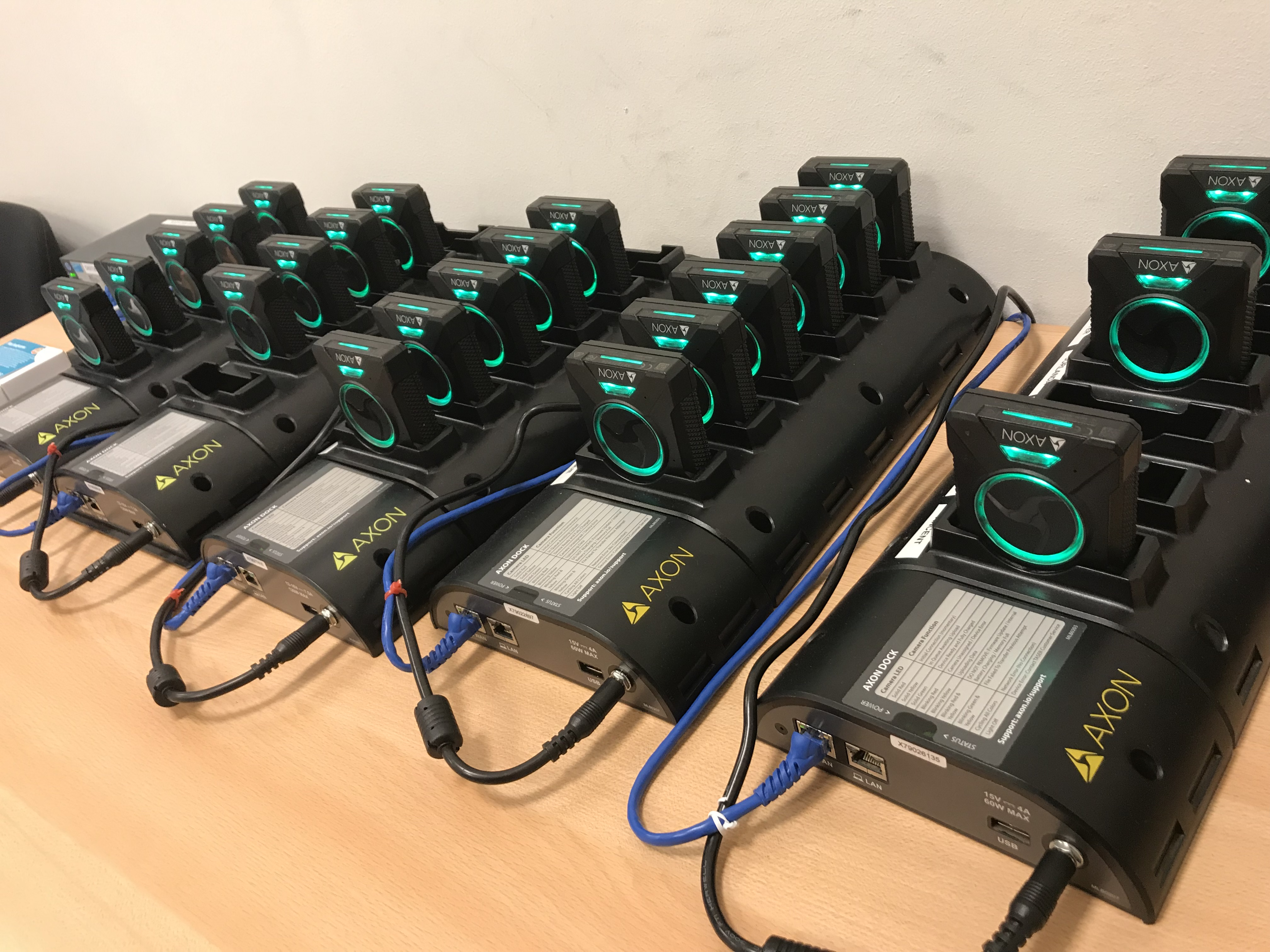
Bodycams in docking stations during charging of batteries and uploading of recordings

In any case, the camera itself is just the start of the expenses. Police departments also have to run software and store data for all the cameras which can add up quickly. Other costs include maintenance, training and evaluations. In addition, several indirect costs will be incurred by body cams, for instance, the hours police and others in the criminal justice system spend on managing, reviewing and using the recordings for prosecution or other purposes such as internal reviews, handling of complaints or education. These 'hidden' costs are difficult to quantify, but by looking into total cost of ownership, some indication can be given of the percentage of costs is associated with the body cameras themselves or other expenses:

- The New South Wales Police Force in Australia produced 930 terabytes of recorded video each year with 350 bodycams. The costs involved in storing and managing the data was estimated at 6.5 million Australian dollars each year. The body cams were bought for less than 10% of that amount.
- The Los Angeles Police Department (United States) acquired 7,000 cameras in 2016 for an amount of $57.6 million. At an estimated price of $570 per camera, the costs of the cameras would be around $4 million, which is 7% of the total amount. The other costs involve replacement equipment and digital storage of the recordings.
- Police in Denver, Colorado (United States) bought 800 body cams and storage servers for the amount of $6.1 million. The price of the body cams was estimated to be 8% of that amount, the other 92% was spent on storage of recordings and management and maintenance of the body cams. The costs involved in reviewing, editing and submitting recorded video or the training of personnel were not included.
- The Sacramento Police Department (California, United States) purchased 890 cameras for all patrol staff under a five-year, $4 million agreement. Storage on an ongoing basis was expected to cost about $1 million per year. The city would also hire three full-time police employees to handle technology issues, including editing of video.
- The Houston Police Department (Texas, United States) estimated that the total cost of about 4,100 cameras was $3.4 million for the equipment and an expected $8 million over five years to buy servers and other equipment to store video collected by the cameras, plus staffing costs.
- Toronto Police Service (Canada) concluded that the major challenge associated with any adoption of body-worn cameras is the cost. Staffing, technology and storage requirements would be about $20 million in the first year of implementation, with a total 5-year estimated cost of roughly $51 million, not including costs for integration of records management and video asset management systems. The most expensive component would be storage of recordings reaching nearly 5 petabytes in five years

== By country ==
=== Australia ===
The number of body-worn cameras in use by the police of Australia is growing increasingly prevalent in parallel with other countries. The first bodycams or 'cop-cams' were trialed in Western Australia in 2007. Victoria has been trialing body-worn cameras since 2012, and in 2015 the NSW police announced they had invested AU$4 million in rolling out body-worn cameras to frontline police officers. Queensland police have had the cameras in operation for some time, and have already collected 155,000 hours worth of footage. According to research being conducted in 2016 'the use of body-worn cameras has now gathered traction in most Australian states and territories'. Despite the increasing prevalence of the devices, some Australian commentators have expressed privacy concerns.

=== Brazil ===
More than 30,000 body cameras are in use by police officers and municipal guards throughout the country, according to a survey conducted by the MJSP (Ministry of Justice and Public Security).

The survey is part of a diagnostic carried out in partnership with universities to outline the current scenario of the use of cameras in the country. According to the government, by August 2023, 26 of the Federation units were already using the equipment or preparing to start its use.

Three states have the most widespread use, according to the ministry: São Paulo, Santa Catarina, and Rio de Janeiro. In addition to these, in another 4 states, the implementation process has already begun: Minas Gerais, Rio Grande do Norte, Roraima, and Rondônia.

=== Belgium ===
As of January 2024, there are approximately 4,000 body cameras in use across local police zones and the federal police. Their use has been increasing since 2018, initially covered under the law for dash cameras, but now regulated by a specific new law aimed at combating violence and enhancing transparency. Additionally, the Belgian police have recently acquired 5,000 new body cams from a Swedish security company as part of a broader contract. The new legislation provides clarity on when and how they can be used, with footage typically stored for 30 days unless needed as evidence.

=== Canada ===
Some police services in Canada such as the Calgary Police Service have outfitted all front-line officers with body-worn video systems since 2019. Police unions in Canada have been opposed to body-worn video systems, citing privacy and cost concerns. In 2015, several city police units, including those in Winnipeg and Montreal announced plans to experiment with the technology. The Toronto Police Service started a pilot in 2014 with the technology during a year-long study of body-worn cameras. In total, 100 officers were using the technology from May 2015 through May 2016. The evaluation report concluded that support for the body cameras was strong and increased during the pilot. There were technical issues, for instance with battery life, camera mounting, docking, recharging, ability to classify, ease of review and other issues. In September 2016, the Toronto police wanted to put out a call for proposals from suppliers.

=== Singapore ===
The Singapore Police Force announced in January 2015 that officers stationed at its Neighbourhood Police Centres will be issued body cameras with those located at Bukit Merah West. Officers stationed at Ang Mo Kio North, Bedok South, Bukit Merah East, Jurong West and Toa Payoh in June 2015 with the entire island covered by June 2016. The Reveal RS3-SX body camera is issued to the SPF.

The SPF mentioned that strict safeguard are in place with video footage to be deleted 31 days after they're shot unless they're needed in an active case. Officers are allowed to deactivate the cameras at their discretion according to the situation, such as cases of encountering sexual assault victims.

=== United Kingdom ===
==== First tests (2005) ====
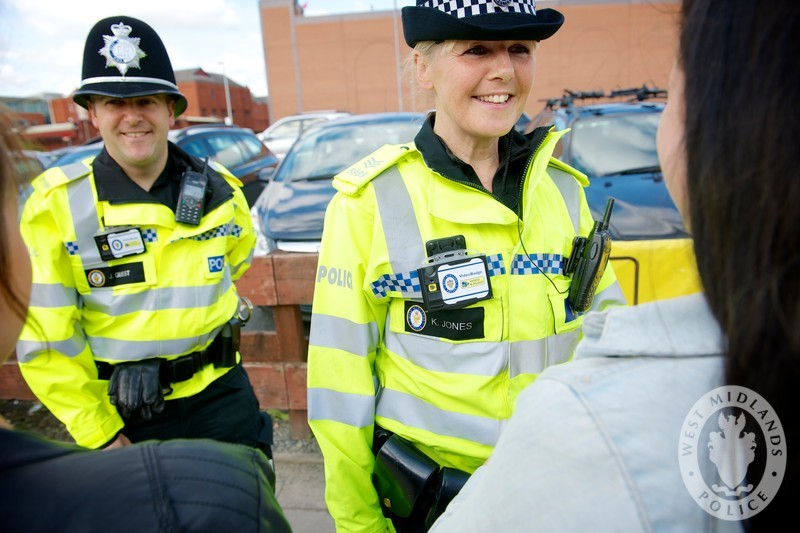
Body worn cameras being trialled by officers in Wolverhampton and Birmingham

Body-worn video cameras received wide media coverage because of the first testing of body-worn cameras in the United Kingdom in 2005. The test was begun on a small-scale by Devon and Cornwall Police. In 2006, the first significant deployments of BWV at the national level were undertaken by the Police Standards Unit (PSU) as part of the Domestic Violence Enforcement Campaign (DVEC). The basic command units equipped with the head cameras recorded everything that happened during an incident from the time of arrival which led to the "preservation of good-quality first disclosure evidence from the victim". The evidence gathered was deemed especially useful in the way of supporting prosecutions if the victim was reluctant to give evidence or press charges.

==== Plymouth study (2007) ====
This led the Home Office to publish a report stating that "evidence gathering using this equipment has the potential radically to enhance the police performance at the scene of a wide range of incidents". In the same report, the Home Office concluded that body worn camera system used in Devon and Cornwall had "the ability to significantly improve the quality of the evidence provided by police officers at incidents". However, mostly due to the limitations of the then available technology, it was also recommended that police forces should await the completion of successful trials and projects to re-evaluate the technology before investing in cameras. By July 2007, the Home Office was beginning to encourage the emerging industry and published another document entitled "Guidance for the Police use of Body Worn Cameras". The report was based on the first national pilot of BWV conducted in Plymouth.

Tony McNulty MP, Minister of State for Security, Counter-Terrorism and Police wrote a foreword that held BWV in a promising light: "The use of body-worn video has the potential to improve significantly the quality of evidence provided by police officers…video recording from the scene of an incident will capture compelling evidence…that could never be captured in written statements." Despite being hailed as a tool to enhance the quality of evidence, the focus was beginning to shift away from exclusively benefiting prosecutions. The Home Office highlighted that BWV also had the significant potential to "prevent and deter crime". In addition, the final report on the National Pilot for BWV announced that complaints against the officers wearing the cameras had been reduced to zero and time spent on paperwork had been reduced by 22.4%, which led to a 9.2% increase in officer time spent on patrol ("50 minutes of a 9-hour shift").

==== 40+ UK police areas with BWV (2010) ====
Following the national pilot, BWV began to gain some traction in the UK and, by 2008, Hampshire Police began to use the technology in parts of the Isle of Wight and the mainland. These were the first steps that paved the way for Chief Constable Andy Marsh becoming the national lead for BWV. Pioneers of BWV in the UK began to drive the need to review the legislation surrounding the use of the equipment. In 2009 the Security Industry Authority concluded that a CCTV license could be extended to cover the use of a body camera. The summary stated that a CCTV license was required to review footage from a body camera and that a door supervision or security guard license was required to operate a body camera if security activities were also being performed.

In 2010, five years after the first BWV venture, over 40 UK police areas were using body cameras to varying degrees. Grampian Police were one such force that initiated a trial in July 2010 which paved the way for the Paisley and Aberdeen body wore video project in 2011. The project was considered a huge success and it was identified that the benefits saved an estimated minimum of £400,000 per year due to the following:

- Increase public reassurance;
- Reduce fear of crime in local communities;
- Increase early guilty pleas;
- Resolve complaints about the police or wardens more quickly;
- Reduce assaults on officers.

The concluding sections of the report on the Paisley and Aberdeen project turned the attention to the digital, back-end solutions for BWV. Now that the benefits of using body cameras are being realized, the implications on the digital infrastructure are being called into question. The report suggested providing "robust central IT support" to establish the processes behind information gathering and monitoring.

==== Code of practice surveillance cameras ====
In 2013 the Home Office released an updated code of practice for surveillance cameras, in which Principle 8 included the use of body cameras, stating: "Surveillance camera system operators should consider any approved operational, technical and competency standards relevant to a system and its purpose and work to meet and maintain those standards". 2013 also saw the start of Operation Hyperion, a Hampshire Police initiative on the Isle of Wight that equipped every frontline police officer with a personal issue body worn camera, the biggest project of its kind at the time.

Sergeant Steve Goodier oversaw the project and was adamant that the project would drive legislative changes to free up further uses for body worn cameras. He said: "I strongly believe we could make some small changes to legislation that can have a big impact on officers: "PACE was written in 1984 at a time when BWV was not around...We want to get the legislation changed so that BWV could replace the need for handwritten statements from officers when it is likely that an early guilty plea would be entered at court or that the incident could be dealt with a caution or community resolution."

==== MPS ====
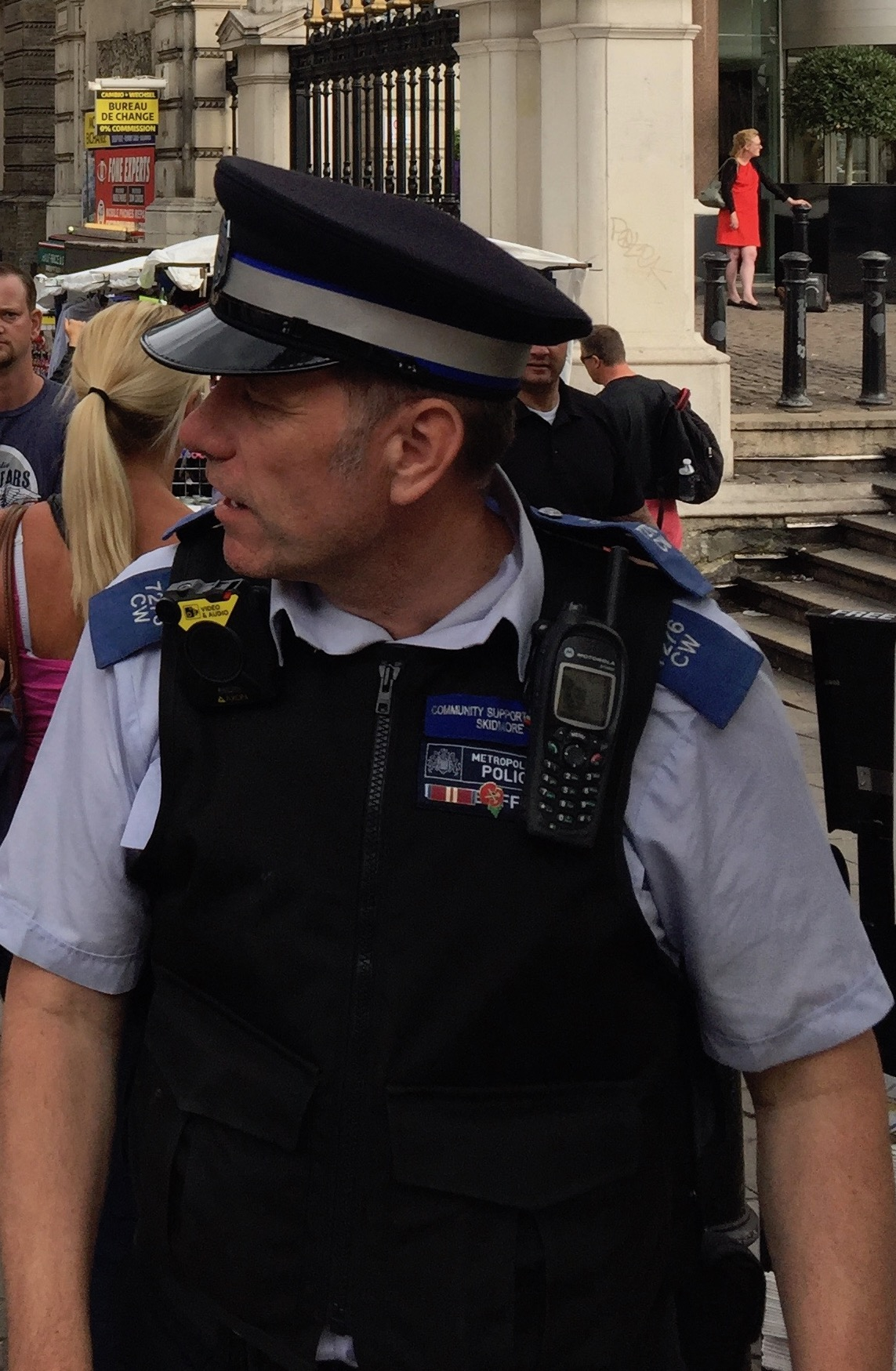
PCSO in London (UK) with bodycam

In 2014, the Metropolitan Police Service began a 12 month trial in ten London boroughs, testing the impact of BWV on complaints, stop and search and criminal justice outcomes for violent offenses. Following the trial, the decision was made to issue body cameras to all officers who have regular engagement with the public. Other officers will be able to access cameras on an ‘as needed’ basis. A total of 22,000 cameras will be issued.

==== Northern Ireland ====
In 2016, the Police Service of Northern Ireland (PSNI) formally introduced BWV technology commencing with Derry City and Strabane District, with Belfast becoming the second District to introduce the technology. A pilot BWV camera scheme was run during 2014/15, which illustrated the benefits of BWV. On that basis a business case was submitted to the Department of Justice and funding was secured to purchase BWV, following the success of the PSNI deployment.

==== Devon and Cornwall ====
In September 2018, Devon and Cornwall Police announced their intention to begin outfitting officers with body worn cameras. The force was the first to trial BWV in the UK in 2005. The project was launched alongside Dorset Police. The cameras will be switched on by officers to record specific incidents including performing arrests, searches, stopping motor vehicles for any reason, and during violent incidents or where domestic abuse or modern slavery are suspected.

=== China ===
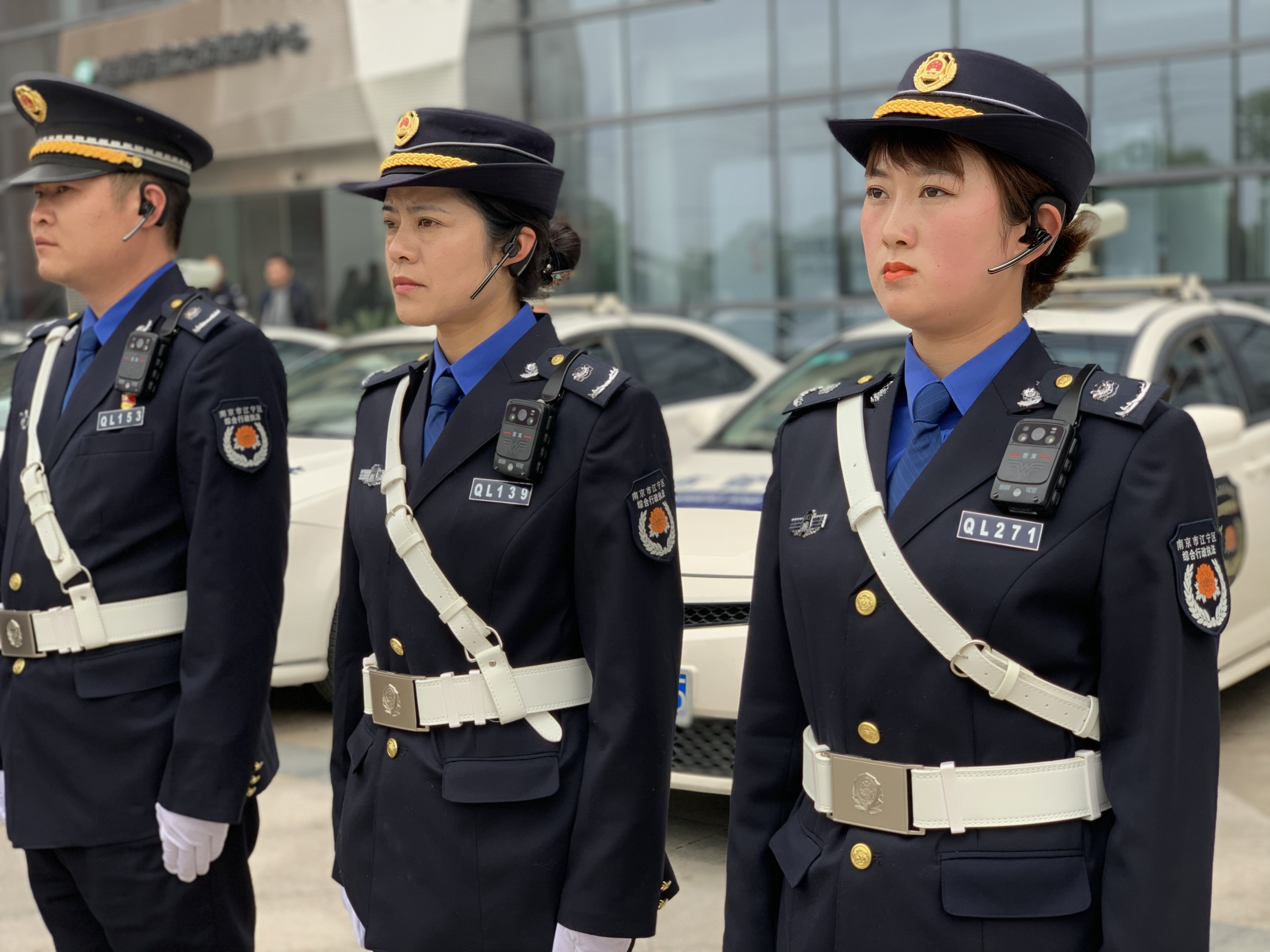
Urban Management Officer with Body worn Camera

The use of body-worn cameras by law enforcement offers potential advantages in keeping officers safe, enabling situational awareness, improving community relations and accountability, and providing evidence for trials. A legislation regarding body-worn camera has been enacted by the Ministry of Public Security, making the body-worn camera standard and mandatory policing equipment for law enforcement agencies in China.

==== Hong Kong ====
The police in Hong Kong has been experimenting with body cameras since 2013. Based on positive findings from an (unpublished) evaluation, the decision was taken to supply all front-line officers with a bodycam.

=== Denmark ===
The police in Denmark has been credited in English media as the first police force to use body cameras, even before the English pilots of 2007 were initiated. In 2017, the Minister of Justice has equipped security personnel in detention centers with body cameras.

=== Finland ===
==== Pilot project (2015) ====
In Finland, a pilot with body cameras was started in 2015. Thirty cameras were used by the Helsinki Police Department to help the police in maintaining public order. It was hoped that body cameras might prevent crime and disorder. Furthermore, it was expected that the cameras could at the same time improve the way the police worked. The cameras were meant to be used in specific settings and only in public places. Filming inside homes would only be allowed as part of a criminal investigation. The data were to be encrypted and could only be accessed with specific software, according to the police. It was expected that most recordings would be deleted right after each shift, because of the need for privacy protection.

===== Results =====
According to a report from 2017 by a working-group, the pilot justified the national roll-out of bodycams in Finland. The report concluded that police officers' safety improved, reduced resistance to the police and better protected police. During the experiment in Helsinki, the report noted, behavior of citizens improved when people see that the situation is being recorded. The introduction could be based on current legislation, but an additional legal framework would be needed regulating recording and storage of recordings. Filming inside homes is not generally allowed. The cameras could be available at the end of 2018, after the necessary training and purchases. The Federation of Police Officers wants provisions to make sure that human errors will not be problematic for officers wearing cameras. The question is whether police can erase recordings when they want to. According to the working group, this is no different from the handling of other police documentation. During the pilot, the recordings were stored for 24 hours and then wiped, unless a criminal offense was recorded. The working group recommended to extend that period to 96 hours.

==== Plans for national roll-out (2018) ====
In early 2018, some 30 cameras were in use at Helsinki police department on a trial basis. The National Police Board recommended in April 2018 to issue all police officers on patrol with cameras. The ambition is to make the procurements in 2018. The two main reasons are to improve officers' safety by reducing confrontations with members of the public and to make recordings that can be used as evidence.

Other law enforcement agencies

Finnish parking inspectors from Vaasa, Jyväskylä, and Kotka have been using bodycams since the spring of 2021 and have reported fewer threatening incidents since they began wearing body cameras on their uniforms.

=== France ===
French law enforcement has been using bodycams – called 'caméra-piéton' or 'pedestrian cameras' in French – regularly since 2013. Prior to implementing this, an early experiment in 2009 did not succeed.

==== Police ====
National and municipal police have also been outfitted with body cameras, starting with 2,000 cameras in 2017, after experimentation during the previous years. This number of cameras has been expanded and 10,400 additional cameras are being rolled out in what has been called a 'massive deployment'. Nearly 400 municipalities applied for permission to use bodycams in the pilot that was conducted in 2017 and 2018.

==== Other organizations ====
In 2018, the senate approved plans to experiment with bodycams in fire fighting and in detention centers. Other organisations that use these small wearable cameras are the national organisation for rail transport (SNCF), but also regional public transport for Paris (RATP). In 2019, public transport company Kéolis, introduced body cameras for its security staff on trams and buses in the city of Brest.

==== Uses ====
The body cameras in France are intended to de-escalate interventions and reassure the security forces. Formally, according to the 2016 law, that was extended in 2018 for use of bodycams by municipal police officers, the goals of the cameras are:

1. prevention of incidents during interventions by the police or the military (gendarmerie nationale);
2. detection of violations of the law and the prosecution of the suspects by collecting evidence;
3. training and education of officers

==== Legal framework ====
The legal framework has been determined by a law of June 3, 2016, by the national committee on information and freedoms (Commission Nationale de l'Informatique et des Libertés - CNIL). Their opinion is that because of the elevated risks created by surveillance of persons and personal life that could result from the use of these cameras, a specific legal framework was needed. Separate laws have been developed for national police and gendarmerie and for municipal police - the latter being adopted by parliament in 2018. Recordings have to be retained for at least six months. Specific legislation has also been developed for law enforcement in sectors such as rail transportation and regional public transport for Paris. One of the key components of the law in France is that officers are not allowed to review the recordings. However, the bodycams acquired offered this option and would have to be replaced with different type progressively, but not before the end of 2017 - according to the source quoted in the article.

==== Identity checks ====
One of the main reasons for the national police, gendarmerie and municipal police to start using bodycams is the systematic recording of identity checks in public places. Starting in March 2017, the police and gendarmerie in 23 prioritised security zones ('zones de securité priorities), including Paris, Marseille, Nice, Toulouse and Lyon, had to record each identity check. Up to 2013, the decision to start a recording was discretionary, but after 2017 recording of these checks was supposed to become the rule. According to a critical article, this requirement was not fulfilled, given the fact that there were 2,500 bodycams available for the total of around 245,000 officers in the country. Some controversy surrounded the introduction because of a statement in the Senate by ministre de l'intérieur, Bruno le Roux, that recording would be triggered automatically – a statement that later had to be revoked because it proved to be incorrect. The report describing the results of the experiment was not published, but a spokesperson of the National Police told a reporter that the cameras increase the legitimacy of officers, pacify difficult situations and offer the possibility to record the specifics of each intervention, in this case identity checks.

==== Future developments ====
The Mayor of the city of Nice has asked the Minister of the Interior to rewrite the legal framework to include live streaming of bodycam-footage. This would enable supervision centers to not only watch regular CCTV-cameras but also body cameras. Included in the request was the suggestion to enable these centers to distribute the footage to the devices in police vehicles. The national privacy watchdog, CNIL, has called for a democratic debate to define appropriate frameworks and to strike a balance between security and the rights and freedoms of everyone.

=== Germany ===
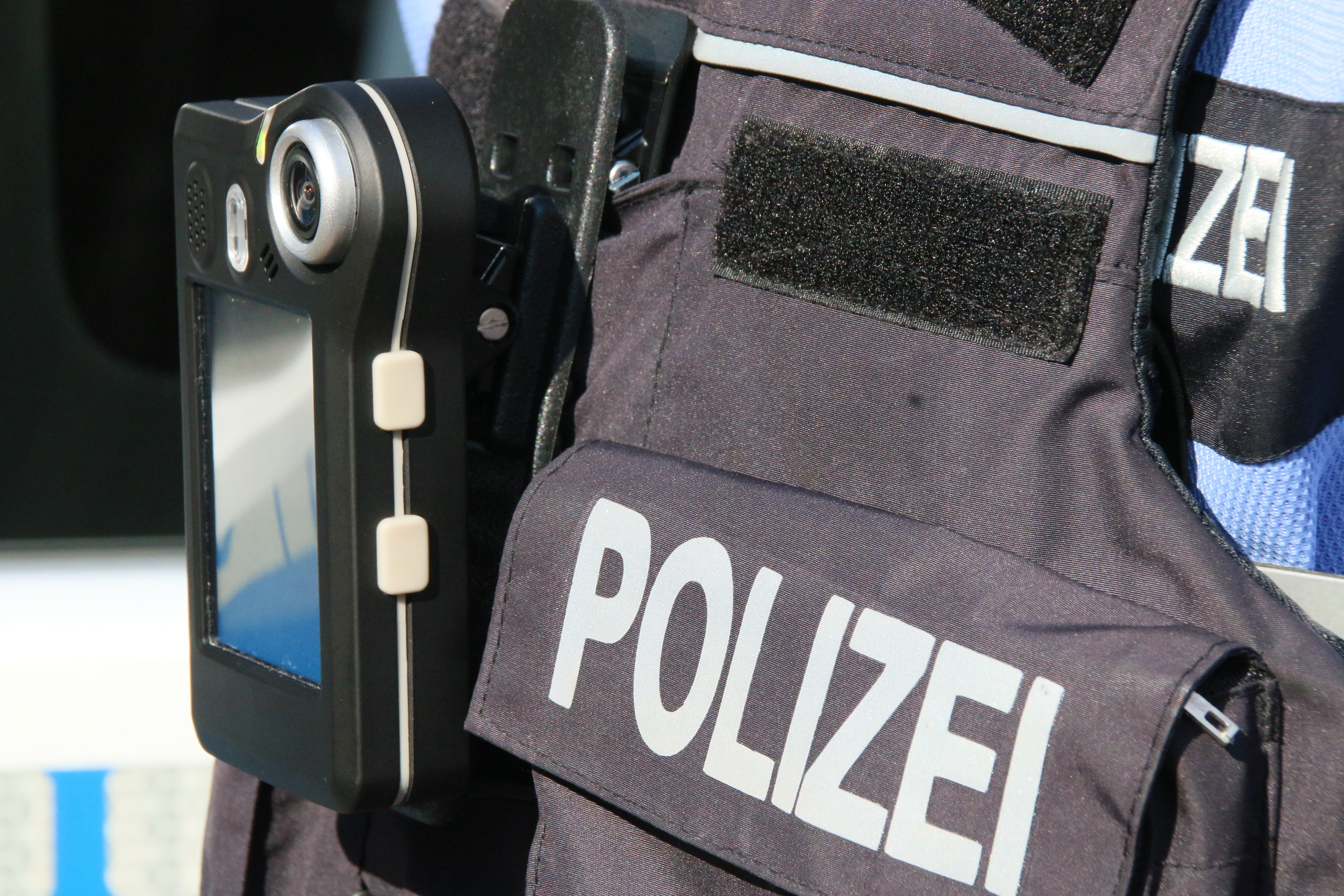
Bodycam used by the Magdeburg Police (Germany)

==== Reasons for body cams ====
In some parts of Germany, some state police services have used body-worn video systems since 2013 and the number of states (German: Land or Länder) where police use bodycams has increased ever since. The reason for the introduction of these cameras in Germany has overwhelmingly been to protect police against assaults from suspects. The second reason is the ability to reconstruct events and to use the recording as evidence. A third reason has been the fact that civilians are filming the police and that the police wants to add their own recordings to what they perceive as selective filming by civilians. As Rüdiger Seidenspinner, the president of the union of policemen for the State of Baden-Württemberg, explained: "The reason is simple: our colleagues have had enough in this era of smartphones of being filmed only when they intervene. What caused the intervention, what actions, insults etc. took place does not seem to concern anyone. Furthermore, we will not use the BodyCam in all situations, but only for specific deployments and especially in areas with high levels of crime". According to a representative sample of 1,200 citizens from Germany in 2015, a majority of 71% is in favor of body cameras and 20% is opposed to the technology.

==== States with body cams ====
Detailed information is available on the use of body cameras in five Länder. In State of Hesse, the police were the first force in Germany to use body cams in May 2013. According to official registrations, the resistance (Widerstand) to police decreased from 40 to 25 and only one of the policemen wearing a body camera was wounded, compared to nine colleagues without camera. Following the pilot, the number of body cams acquired went up from the original 13 to 72 in total, also meant for other areas in Hesse. The success of the pilot inspired many other German cities and the Federal Police to start using body cameras as well. Police services from Hungary, Switzerland, and Austria were interested as well and asked the German police for information.

In the State of Rhineland-Palatinate body cams are in use since July 2015 in the cities of Mainz and Koblenz to reduce violence towards the police and to collect footage that can be used as evidence. The costs of these body cams was 18.500 euro. Based on the positive experiences, eighty more bodycams have been acquired to be deployed in more areas in these two cities. In Hamburg, one of five members in each team that surveils during weekends is equipped with a bodycam since June 2015. These cameras can be pointed in different directions by manually operated remote control. Since 2016, the Bavarian State Police has been testing bodycams in Munich, Augsburg and Rosenheim. The cameras have to be activated in critical situations and at dangerous locations, for instance in nightlife entertainment areas where fighting is a common occurrence. In Baden-Württemberg, bodycams are deployed in Stuttgart, Mannheim and Freiburg since 2016. The aim here is to test the bodycams during one year with the purpose of reducing violence against the police. Since late 2022 Berlin's police have implemented a pilot program with bodycams.

==== Federal police ====
Starting in February 2016, the Federal Police began testing bodycams at train stations in Berlin, Cologne, Düsseldorf and Munich. In early 2017, the Bundestag agreed with government plans to introduce bodycams to protect officers.

==== Legal issues ====
All Länder in the country use bodycams, but there are substantial differences in the legal framework. Some have explicitly created a legal basis (Hesse, Hamburg, Saarland, Bremen, Baden-Württemberg), some are still working on it and in the meantime fall back on existing norms (North Rhine-Westphalia, Lower Saxony, pilot projects in Bavaria, Rhineland-Palatinate, Saxony-Anhalt, Federal Police). Still others have no concrete plans for legal adaptations (Berlin, Brandenburg, Mecklenburg-Vorpommern, Saxony, Schleswig-Holstein and Thuringia).

=== Hungary ===
The Budapest Police Headquarters conducted trials with body cameras, and the results were favorable. They demonstrated significant benefits. Following the successful trials, the National Police Headquarters plans to introduce body cameras more broadly. Police Colonel Róbert Major noted that body cameras are expected to reduce offenses against police officers significantly.

=== India ===
In Indian cities like New Delhi, Bangalore, Bhubaneswar, Mumbai, Chennai, Kolkata and states like Goa, Body cameras have been made compulsory when officiating an arrest, searching a property, land or vehicle or responding to a critical incident. With the passage of the Bhartiya Nyaya Sanhita and the repeal of the colonial era Indian Penal Code, filming crime scenes and seizures had become mandatory, hence body camera were deemed necessary. In Goa, only police inspectors with body cameras can issue traffic challans according to a directive by the chief minister. A multitude of benefits were highlighted for these body cameras, such as increased transparency and accountability, simplifying proceedings under the Bhartiya Nagarik Suraksha Sanhita, and improving the infamous reputation of the Indian Police for their lack of accountability and transperancy. As of 2023, there were about 100,000 body cameras worn by law enforcement agencies across India.

=== Italy ===
==== Milan and Turin (2015 and 2017) ====
In the cities of Milan and Turin, police forces have started experimenting on a small scale with bodycams. One of the first projects started in 2015 in Turin where police used the bodycams for their own protection during protests. Starting in May 2017, ten bodycams were being trialled by the police forces of Turin and Milan to be used in high-risk operations and use-of-force incidents. Part of the trial was to connect the live streams of the cameras to the control-room of the police. The bodycams for these pilots were supplied free of charge by a manufacturer for a period of three months. Based on the experiences during the trials, a decision would have to be reached whether to supply all front-line officers with bodycams. The price for fifty bodycams in Milan was 215,000 euros.

==== Rome (2017) ====
Police officers in Rome have not yet been equipped with bodycams. However, in October 2017, the secretary of the union Sulpl Roma, announced that police officers who ask for them will receive a bodycam before the end of the year 2017. The reason would be two-fold: to modernise the officers' equipment and to settle disputes with drivers who disagree with police, for instance over a fine or the cause of an accident.

==== Privacy ====
The privacy law governing the use of bodycams by police in Italy is the law that protects personal data. According to a spokesperson of the police in Rome the law allows for the creation of video recordings of police interventions, provided the footage is used only for the reconstruction of police activity. The fact that other people including innocent by-standers could be recognised by their faces or voices does not mean the recording can not be used for legitimate purposes.

=== Japan ===
Japanese law enforcement has been experimenting with body cams since 2022, but possibly even before then.

==== Police ====
In order to quickly and accurately share the situation at the scene of an incident, Aichi Prefectural Police have introduced a system that automatically transmits video footage of police officers at the scene of an incident to the prefectural police headquarters in real time. This is the first time in Japan that a system capable of automatic filming and distribution has been used, and the prefectural police hope it will lead to the early resolution of incidents and ensure the safety of victims. The system was developed independently by the prefectural police and was introduced in March. Police officers arriving at the scene use a small camera on a mobile phone attached to the right breast. When the officer operates the radio, the camera is automatically activated and starts recording video, and the video and sound are transmitted to headquarters and the relevant department at each police station.

According to the prefectural police, the cameras are worn by all police officers working at the 384 police stations in the prefecture. Until now, the situation at the scene of an incident has been communicated verbally over the radio, but from now on, detailed information on the scene of an incident, as well as the physique and clothing of the suspicious person the police officer confronts, can be instantly shared in the form of video images from the moment the radio is used. In radio communication only, it was sometimes time-consuming to ascertain information, as it was necessary to repeatedly confirm the facts between the police officer on the scene and the person in charge of the communication command. The introduction of the system is expected to shorten the time from the moment an incident is detected to the time the police are dispatched to the scene.

Some police officers in Japan will use body cameras in a trial in 2024, with the idea of introducing them across the country in the future, the National Police Agency announced on August 30, 2023.

The NPA will check the footage to see if officers are questioning people appropriately, among other purposes. Relatively large prefectural police forces will implement the system first, and the NPA will consider full-scale introduction after verifying its effectiveness. About 15 million yen (approx. $103,000) for related expenses has been included in the agency's fiscal 2024 budget request.

According to the NPA, a total of 102 wearable cameras are to be purchased, including 65 for local areas, 19 for crowd control, and 18 for traffic divisions. In the case of the crowd control officers, the cameras will capture video of situations with many people coming and going, and the feeds will be monitored remotely in real time. For traffic, the video will be used to educate drivers on road violations. In principle, police officers will still watch for traffic offenses on-site, with the bodycam footage expected to play a supporting role.

There are several types of wearable cameras that attach to different parts of the body, such as the head and chest. Which type will be used has not yet been decided. Data storage periods and other operational practices will also be considered later.

In August 2025, Japan’s National Police Agency launched a pilot program to trial body-worn cameras for police officers. The initiative aims to evaluate effectiveness in three areas: community policing (39 cameras in Tokyo, Osaka, and Fukuoka for three months), traffic enforcement (18 cameras in Aichi, Niigata, and Kōchi for six months), and crowd security (18 cameras in nine prefectures for one year). Cameras will not be used during private home visits, and footage retention periods range from one week to three months, depending on the operation. The results of these trials will determine whether body cameras will be adopted nationwide by FY 2027.

==== Other organizations ====
In December 2022, JR-EAST station staff to be equipped with body cameras in order to deal with incidents with passengers.

=== Lithuania ===
in December 2022, Over 2,500 Motorola VB400 body cameras have been deployed to the Lithuanian National Police and Border Guard Service for situational awareness in daily operations, including patrols and border security across Lithuania's 1,000 kilometer border with the European Union.

=== Netherlands ===
==== Police ====
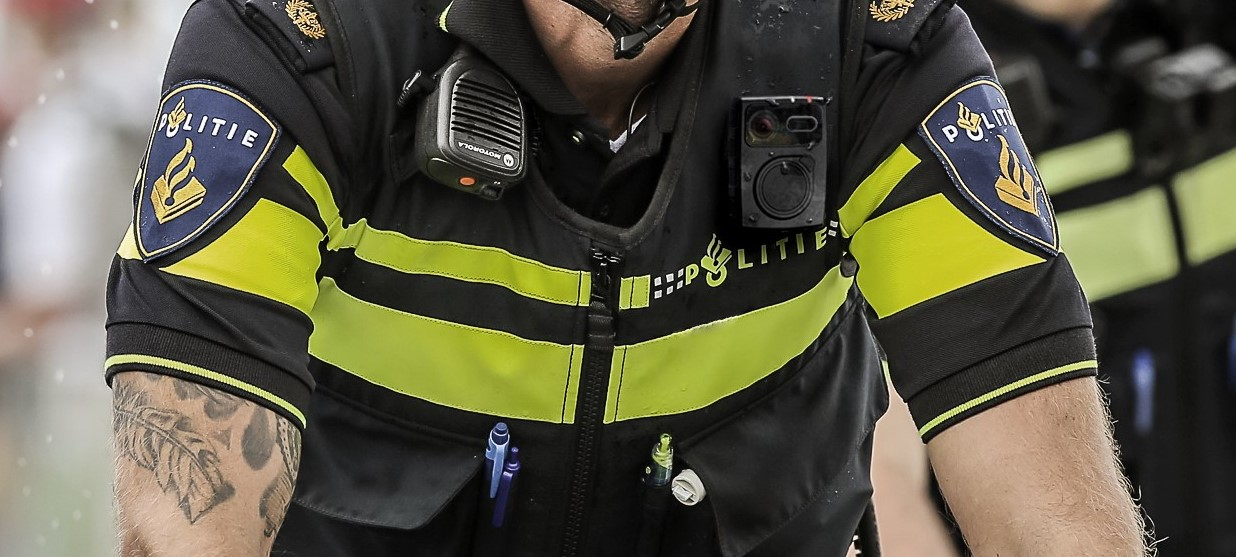
The Netherlands national police with bodycams

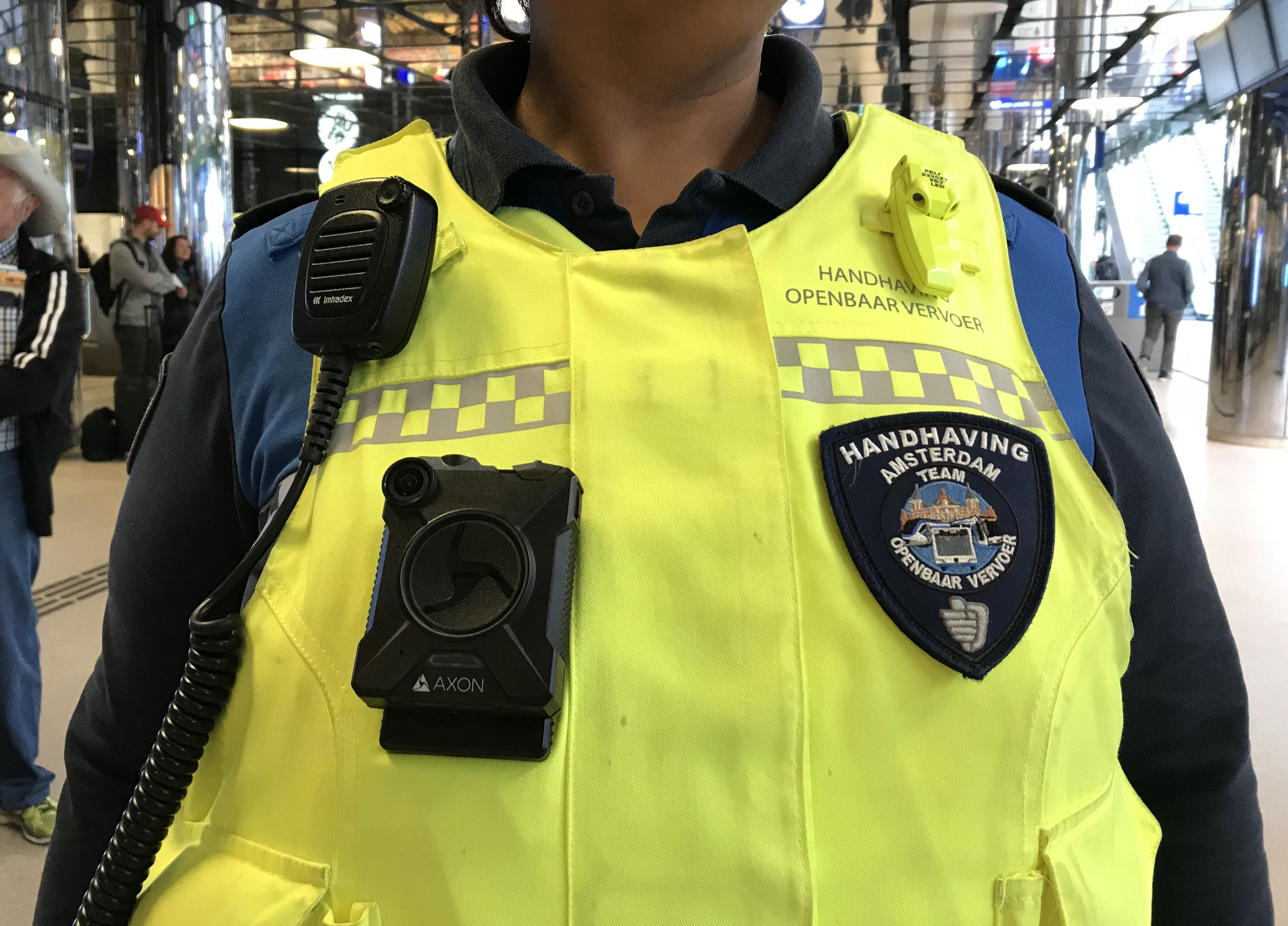
Public transport officer in Amsterdam with bodycam

The first body worn video cameras used by the Dutch police were portable videocameras used by the mounted riot-police in 1997. The first experiments with more modern bodycams date back to 2008 and were all small-scale technical tests. After four large-scale experiments from 2009 through 2011, the conclusion was that bodycams did not reduce violence and aggression against the police, largely due to technical problems with recordings and 'wearability' of the equipment. The Department of Justice concluded that bodycams were not ready to be 'rolled out' on the national level. Regional police forces continued experimenting with bodycams. In 2011, according to a survey by one of the major suppliers of BWV cameras in the Netherlands, 17 of the 25 regional police forces were using bodycams in 2011.

In 2015, the Dutch National Police published their plans to integrate more 'sensing' capabilities into routine police work. This plan focused on CCTV, automatic number plate recognition and bodycams. Thirty experiments were conducted with body cameras to determine whether the technology should become part of the standard equipment of all police officers. The biggest experiment was done in Amsterdam where one hundred body cams were tested for 12 months by 1,500 officers. The trial was monitored and independently evaluated, according to the highest possible methodological standard: a randomized controlled trial. Violence and aggression towards police officers were reduced significantly. Based on these positive findings, the management of the National Police in 2019 decided to roll-out 2,000 body cams to all front-line police units in the country. Results from a 2022 research report show that 86% of police officers find that the body cams have (a lot) of added value to their work, with officers also feeling safer on duty while carrying body cams. The research report further found that the body cams have added value for investigations, training, and evaluation.

==== Other law enforcement with body cams ====
Other organizations besides the police use body cams, mainly local law enforcement officers employed by municipalities. All local 'handhavers' or city wardens in Amsterdam and Rotterdam wear bodycams, in addition to over thirty smaller cities. Other organizations use body cameras including public transport, security professionals, ambulances and fire-fighters.

=== Pakistan ===
By 2020, different police departments in Pakistan were either planning to or has already started using body cams in a bid to maintain accountability. The Islamabad Capital City Police Department was the first to use body cams in field and had plans to acquire and equip more body cams for police officials manning the different checkpoints around the city as well as those police officials who go for snap checkings.

Karachi Police was planning to induct body cams for its officials as the city sees more violence in the shape of street crimes than any other city in Pakistan. Apart from the police, Islamabad traffic police and National Highway and Motorway Police too are either planning or have already started using body cams.

=== Russia ===
Russian law enforcements has been experimenting with body cams since 2016, but possibly even before then.

==== Police ====
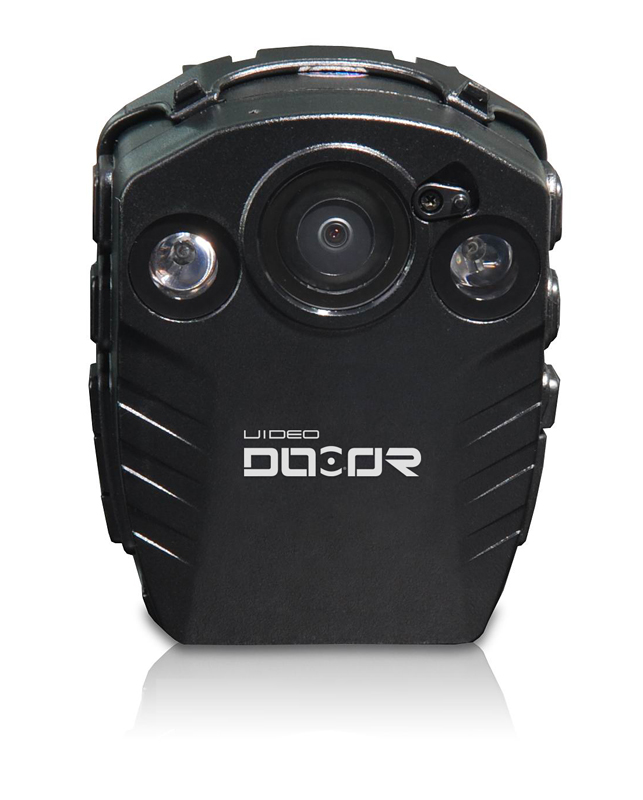
A "DOZOR" body cam used by the Russian police officers

According to Russian Internal Affairs Ministry the end of the 2016 all traffic police officers in Moscow will receive body cameras, which are attached to their clothes and work continuously. In some regions, such devices designed to eradicate corruption in the ranks of traffic police officers, are also purchased by other law enforcement agencies, but in limited quantities - for testing. Total equipping to all Russian police officers with body cameras was scheduled to completed by 2017.

=== Sweden ===
==== Police ====
Swedish police have used body cameras, for instance at large football games and demonstrations. According to a spokesperson for the Swedish Police in 2015, body cameras would not become standard equipment for police officers. They would be used for special purposes because there was no need to record all interactions. "We are not in the same situation as the police in the US who need to document everything in order to maintain credibility". Early trials with body cameras have been carried out in Gothenburg and Södertälje in 2017. Many other Swedish police regions expressed interest in using body cameras. The police in Stockholm have piloted body cameras in 2018 and 2019. In total, 300 body cameras were used in three parts of Stockholm to prevent violence against police officers. The Swedish Crime Prevention Council (Brottsförebyggande rådet - Brå) evaluated the pilot.

The evaluation revealed that the body cameras had the intended effects, but on a relatively modest scale. Certain types of violence decreased: harassment and violence using weapons. Sexual intimidation of female officers was reduced too. The sense of security improved, according to interviews with officers: people 'guard their tongue'. Physical violence has not decreased in the same amount. According to the police, this type of violence is perpetrated by people who are either drunk or mentally troubled. Their behaviour is not adjusted when they realise they are being filmed. Footage has rarely been used as evidence in courts: overall, 178 recordings were pulled for prosecution and conviction. In roughly half of these cases, the footage was used as evidence, but in the other half the decision was made to not submit the recording as evidence. Another conclusion is that the level of activation of bodycams varied from one officer to the next. There was a lack of clear instructions and guidelines on which situations needed to be recorded. The researchers believe that the bodycams could lead to more positive outcomes if a better strategy for the deployment of the bodycams would be developed and implemented.

==== Other law enforcement ====
The Swedish army in Afghanistan has used helmet cameras. In 2016, train hosts in Gothenburg and West Sweden started testing bodycams. They were only allowed to turn on the cameras if a passenger became violent or threatened to use violence. Public transport in Stockholm, Storstockholms Lokaltrafik, started using body cameras in 2018. Security guards were the first to start using these cameras and ticket controllers followed in December 2018. The cameras are used in order to improve the safety of staff. Additionally, the cameras can be used to make a recording of travellers without a valid ticket. By filming them, the identity of the person in question can be verified even if they used someone else's identity during the check.

=== United Arab Emirates ===
Following a successful six month pilot scheme, the Dubai Police Force decided to adopt BWV technology in 2015. Speaking to the media at the time, Gen Al Muzeina flagged-up the value of footage from these cameras. He said that this evidence could, potentially, be used where there are objections to traffic offences or a failure by officers to meet acceptable standards. The Abu Dhabi Police also confirmed in the same year that – following two years of trials – it would be rolling out BWV cameras to patrol officers.

=== United States ===
==== History ====
In 2012, the National Institute of Justice at the United States Department of Justice issued a primer regarding laws, policies, practices, and technology for local police departments to consider.

Following The Law Enforcement Officer-Worn Body Camera Act (effective January 1, 2016), the state of Illinois became one of the first states to have a comprehensive set of rules for police departments in regards to body camera usage. The Chicago Police Department as well as the mayor of the city, Rahm Emanuel, have been vocal about their plan to enact a body-worn camera expansion that would equip police officers by the end of 2017. The goal of this plan, as well as the hiring of more officers, is to improve public trust in the law, expand transparency, and halt the climbing number of homicides. Springfield Police Department (Illinois) has also been among the local departments that have expanded the use of body worn cameras despite the Springfield Police Chief Kenny Winslow stating that "there are still problems with the state body camera law, and many departments in Illinois aren’t adopting the cameras as a result". One of those departments is the Minooka Police Department that discontinued the use of body cameras because they felt overburdened by administrative responsibilities. The considerable cost of cameras and the support of related technology is another factor limiting the speed of their adoption. In New York City, for example, initial purchase of body-worn cameras could cost up to $31 million. However, proponents hypothesized that body-worn cameras would save money by reducing lawsuits targeted towards the police force and by aiding in the dismissal of court cases with digital evidence provided by the recorded footage of the body-worn cameras.

On December 1, 2014, President Barack Obama "proposed reimbursing communities half the cost of buying cameras and storing video—a plan that would require Congress to authorize $75 million over three years to help purchase 50,000 recording devices". He also asked Congress for a $263 million package overall to deal with community policing initiatives that would provide a 50 percent federal match for local police departments to purchase body cameras and to store them. This came about in the aftermath of the killing of Michael Brown. With the push from then President Barack Obama to “expand funding and training to law enforcement agencies through community policing initiatives”, the United States Department of Justice announced in May 2015 that they would grant 73 out of the 285 awards requested for a total of 20 million dollars. This allowed for the purchase and distribution of 21,000 cameras to be placed in active duty. A National Institute of Justice report found this in regards to responding police agencies: "In a sample of police departments surveyed in 2013, approximately 75 percent of them reported that they did not use body-worn cameras". A November 2014 survey of police departments serving the 100 most populous cities, Vocativ found that "41 cities use body cams on some of their officers, 25 have plans to implement body cams and 30 cities do not use or plan to use cams at this time".

Investigations have shown that although in many states the usage of body worn cameras is mandatory, there are instances where some officers have failed to adhere to the law. From 2015 until 2017, there have been nationally recognized scenarios of fatal shootings in San Francisco, Alabama, Washington D.C., and Los Angeles in which the officer was wearing a body camera, but did not activate it during the incident. The Los Angeles Police Department is one of the first to publicly discuss solutions as to how they will try to fix this problem. Small reminders such as stickers in the station and cars are meant to remind officers to use this technology. In addition, Los Angeles Police Department is testing new technology that would activate the cameras at the same time as the officer turns on their emergency lights. The LAPD has also been working with the body camera manufacturer it uses, Taser International, to increase a buffer that saves video from 30 seconds before and after the camera is turned on and off.

In 2026, the Last Week Tonight with John Oliver investigative news series released an exposé about police body cameras, accusing the US federal government of refusing to release on body cam footage of the Killing of Alex Pretti and arguing US police often refuse to release body camera footage when doing so would lead to an officer being charged with a crime. Police body cameras have been used in the 2026 Delaney Hall protests, where police were sued by an advocacy organization for refusing to release body camera footage of a police officer who allegedly stole a journalist's $10,000 camera equipment.

==== Relevant research ====
===== Washington study =====
As more studies in more police departments were performed, the evidence became more mixed. One of the most robust studies was done among thousands of Washington, D.C. officers, led by David Yokum at the Lab@DC, a team of scientists embedded in D.C. government, and Anita Ravishankar at D.C.’s Metropolitan Police Department (M.P.D.). The evaluation found no effect on use-of-force by officers or on the number of complaints by civilians. The researchers concluded that police officers equipped with body cameras used force and confronted civilians in a similar manner compared with officers without body cameras: “This is the most important empirical study on the impact of police body-worn cameras to date. ... These results suggest we should recalibrate our expectations” of cameras’ ability to make a “large-scale behavioral change in policing, particularly in contexts similar to Washington, D.C.". The study not only presents statistical analyses, but also provides qualitative research and analysis to shed light on the controversies surrounding the cameras. According to the study, several factors could explain why the cameras did not change the behavior of the police - even though there was a high level of compliance to the rules governing the activation of the cameras: desensitization to the cameras and the fact that police officers already performed better due to an increase in monitoring of their actions before the introduction of the cameras. A third possibility was that officers without cameras acted similar to officers with cameras, because they were aware of their colleagues who did wear these devices. Since the Washington-study, several others have been published that concluded the body cameras did not live up to - perhaps too high - expectations. The meta-evaluation cited below contains information on all studies if they met the methodological quality requirements.

===== Rialto and Orlando studies =====
An impact assessment, based on 54 Rialto police officers wearing body cameras showed that civilian complaints against officers dropped by 88% and "use of force" dropped by 59%. Another report that studied the effects of police body cameras for 46 officers of the Orlando Police Department over one year. concluded that for officers wearing the body cameras, use-of-force incidents dropped by 53%, civilian complaints dropped by 65%, two in three officers who wore the cameras said they’d want to continue wearing them in the future and that it made them "better officers". Other studies produced similar results. For instance, an analysis by the San Antonio Express-News of San Antonio law enforcement's use of body-worn cameras found that incidents where police used force and formal misconduct complaints decreased significantly. Scholars of crime were unsure to what extent body-worn cameras played a role in these declines, but noted that the results were consistent with trends in other cities were cameras had been introduced.

===== Meta evaluations =====
In reviewing the existing research on police body-worn cameras in 2017, University of Virginia economist Jennifer Doleac noted that the existing research was mixed as to whether the cameras reduce the use of force by police officers or increase the communities' trust in police. But a reduction in complaints against police using excessive force does not necessarily mean there are fewer cases of misconduct, it could mean that people are just not speaking up or the body camera was not turned on and the footage cannot be investigated. More time and research was expected to allow a more precise answer to whether or not body worn cameras improve officer conduct. As more empirical evidence became available, the importance of differences in local contexts and policies was revealed. The level of discretion that officers have in the activation of the body cameras has, for instance, been suggested as one of the deciding characteristics in any body camera policy and therefore in the results that can be expected. Unintended outcomes can even be the result from increased transparency due to over-deterrence: officers who know they are being recorded, will only do the minimum required. These officers may follow protocols strictly, reducing their use of discretion.

==== Accessibility ====
According to Harlan Yu, executive director from Upturn, police body cameras are best embedded in a broader change in culture and legal framework. In particular, the public's ability to access the body camera footage is currently still an issue which affects usefulness of police body camera's against police brutality.

==== Differing stances ====
===== Unions =====
Police unions in several U.S. cities, such as New York City (the Patrolmen's Benevolent Association, which represents part of the NYPD), Las Vegas, and Jersey City, New Jersey, and St. Louis, Missouri, expressed doubts or opposition to body cameras. Specifically, union officials expressed concerns about possible distraction and safety issues, and questioned "whether all the footage filmed by body cameras will be accessible via public-records requests, whether victims of domestic violence will be hesitant to call police if they know they will be filmed and whether paying for the cameras and maintenance will lead to cuts elsewhere in the police budget". Others have worried about a "gotcha discipline". Some unions have argued that it was "mandatory" for police departments to include provisions about body-worn cameras in union contracts because it would be a "clear change in working conditions" as well as something that could "impact an officer's safety".

===== Civil liberties =====
The NAACP National Board of Directors has endorsed the use of policy-based automatic body-worn camera solutions for use by law enforcement. The American Civil Liberties Union is an organization that has been a major proponent of body cameras on officers, but only in certain situations. The ACLU has advocated body camera use for both police departments and U.S. Customs and Border Protection, granted that safeguards are in place to protect the privacy of both officers and civilians. However, they have opposed the use of such camera systems for parking enforcement officers, fire marshals, building inspectors, or other code enforcement officers. The questions raised by the ACLU and others fuel the most heated debate on body-worn cameras. Others, such as Black Lives Matter, have released specific policy solutions to tackle the issue of police violence and escalation that include body cameras for police, limited use of force, and demilitarization of the police are a few of the ten crucial policies listed in Campaign Zero.

===== Application within the courtroom =====
It has been argued that while useful evidence, body camera footage in the courtroom should be presented with great caution. As such, juries should be made aware of their implicit biases while viewing footage, the objectivity of which is incomplete as it does not cover all aspects and context of the situations being filmed.

=== Manufacturers and suppliers ===
In a 2012 market survey by the U.S. Department of Justice, eight companies producing body cameras were compared: Taser International, VisioLogix, StalkerVUE, Scorpion, FirstVU, Wolfcom, MuviView and Panasonic. In 2014, the three top companies that had been producing body cameras throughout the United States were Taser International, VieVu, and Digital Ally. In 2016, a market survey described 66 BWV cameras produced by 38 different vendors.

== See also ==
- Open government
