= Campaign Zero =

American police reform campaign

- Purpose: Police reform
- Website: joincampaignzero.org

Campaign Zero is an American police reform campaign launched on August 21, 2015. The plan consists of ten proposals, all of which are aimed at reducing police violence. The campaign's planning team includes Brittany Packnett, Samuel Sinyangwe, DeRay Mckesson, and Johnetta Elzie. The activists who produced the proposals did so in response to critics who asked them to make specific policy proposals. Subsequent critics of Campaign Zero and of their 8 Can't Wait project point out that some of the policies it recommends are already in place as best practice policies at many police departments. Some of these include the Milwaukee policing survey and the PRIDE act. However, a 2016 study by Campaign Zero found that only three of the eight policy recommendations were adopted by the average police department and that no law enforcement agency had adopted all eight.

== Platform ==
Since its inception, Campaign Zero has collected and proposed policy solutions for police reform in ten areas.

1. End Broken Windows Policing: decriminalize crimes that do not threaten public safety, end profiling and stop and frisk policies, and establish alternative approaches to mental health crises.
2. Community Oversight: establish effective civilian oversight structures and remove barriers to report police misconduct.
3. Limit Use of Force: establish standards and reporting of police use of deadly force, revise local police force policies, end traffic-related police killings and high-speed chases, and monitor how police use force and increase accountability for use of excessive force.
4. Independent Investigations and Prosecutions: lower the standard of proof in civil rights cases against police, use federal funds for independent investigations and prosecutions, establish a State Special Prosecutor's Office for police violence cases, and require independent investigations for all police killing or serious injury cases.
5. Community Representation: recruit police officers who represent the demographic characteristics of their communities and use community feedback to inform policies.
6. Film the Police: uphold the public's right to record police. From its inception in 2015 through November 2020, Campaign Zero also urged municipalities to require police body cameras and enact strict policies governing their use. In November 2020, however, it added a disclaimer reading: "Due to a range of research studies finding no evidence that body cameras reduce police use of force, we caution cities against adopting new body camera programs."
7. Training: invest in rigorous and sustained training and consider unconscious/implicit bias testing.
8. End Policing for Profit: end police department quotas, limit fines and fees for low-income citizens, forbid property seizure, and require police budgets to pay for misconduct fines.
9. Demilitarization: end the federal government's 1033 Program to supply military weaponry to local police departments and institute local restrictions to prevent the purchase of military weapons by police.
10. Fair Police Contracts: remove barriers to misconduct investigations and civilian oversight, keep officer disciplinary history accessible to police departments and to the public, and ensure financial accountability for officers and police departments that kill or seriously injure civilians.

== Campaign ==
Arriving on the heels of protests in Ferguson, New York, Baltimore, and elsewhere over cases of civilians being killed by police officers, Campaign Zero in August 2015 was launched as a "data-driven platform" with the goal of ending police brutality. The same team had created the project MappingPoliceViolence.org four months prior, which tracked and mapped incidents of police violence.

In November 2015, the campaign released its first research report, which examined the use of body cameras in police forces in 30 cities and the fairness, transparency, privacy, and accountability associated with body camera policies. Data about the policies of 17 cities is maintained on a live spreadsheet.

In December 2015, the campaign released a second report, a review of police union contracts in 81 cities, along with an associated campaign called "Check the Police" that seeks to mobilize activists to pursue changes in such contracts. The report examined ways in which union contracts delay interrogations, allow officer personnel files to be erased, disqualify complaints, and limit civilian oversight. An actively updated database of contracts and analysis is maintained by the campaign online.

In June 2016, the campaign continued its work on police union contracts with the release of its third report, "Police Union Contracts and Police Bill of Rights Analysis." This report focused on use of force policies and evaluated protections in those policies for civilians.

== Reception ==
Because many of the policies Campaign Zero recommends are already in place in some police departments, Slate contributor Ben Mathis-Lilley has said that with the launch of its site, Campaign Zero "is saying to mainstream politicians: Here are some products that have been sold before—now do your job." Harold Pollack has stated that the document in which the campaign announced its proposals is "a very useful and professional document", and that certain proposals it made, such as increasing police diversity and reducing the use of monetary punishments to raise revenue, seemed "particularly smart."

On January 19, 2016, it was ranked as one of 20 tech insiders defining the 2016 United States presidential election by the staff of Wired.

== 8 Can't Wait project ==
In June 2020, in response to the murder of George Floyd, Campaign Zero launched 8 Can't Wait, a database that tracks how eight policies to curtail police violence are employed in major cities. The eight policies are:

1. Ban chokeholds and strangleholds.
2. Require de-escalation.
3. Require a warning before shooting.
4. Require that all alternatives be exhausted before shooting.
5. Require officers to intervene when excessive force is being used.
6. Ban shooting at moving vehicles.
7. Establish a Force Continuum.
8. Require comprehensive reporting.

A 2016 study by Campaign Zero found that only three of the eight policy recommendations were adopted by the average police department and that no law enforcement agency had adopted all eight.

A number of celebrities have magnified the #8cantwait hashtag, including Oprah Winfrey and Ariana Grande. Since the project was announced, some cities have responded by enacting all eight policies or indicating that they will review their policies to embrace all eight. Only San Francisco, California and Tucson, Arizona were initially identified by Campaign Zero as implementing all eight policies.

=== Criticism ===
While 8 Can't Wait received initial, widespread praise on social media, the news, and within state government, the agenda began receiving skepticism from progressive groups, who criticized the policies as insufficient to tackle the deep, systemic problems of police brutality. Critics of 8 Can't Wait state that police departments in America cannot be "reformed" and instead must be defunded, and that this money should go towards social programs, which they believe better address the root causes of crime. Critics also cite the instances of murder and violence by police officers in cities that have already passed some of the 8 Can't Wait measures.

8 to Abolition, a campaign for the abolition of prisons and police, was created as a direct criticism and response to 8 Can't Wait.

== #CancelShotSpotter campaign ==
Campaign Zero's launched a program to oppose ShotSpotter installations in 2022 called #CancelShotSpotter.
