= Samuel Sinyangwe =

Data scientist and activist

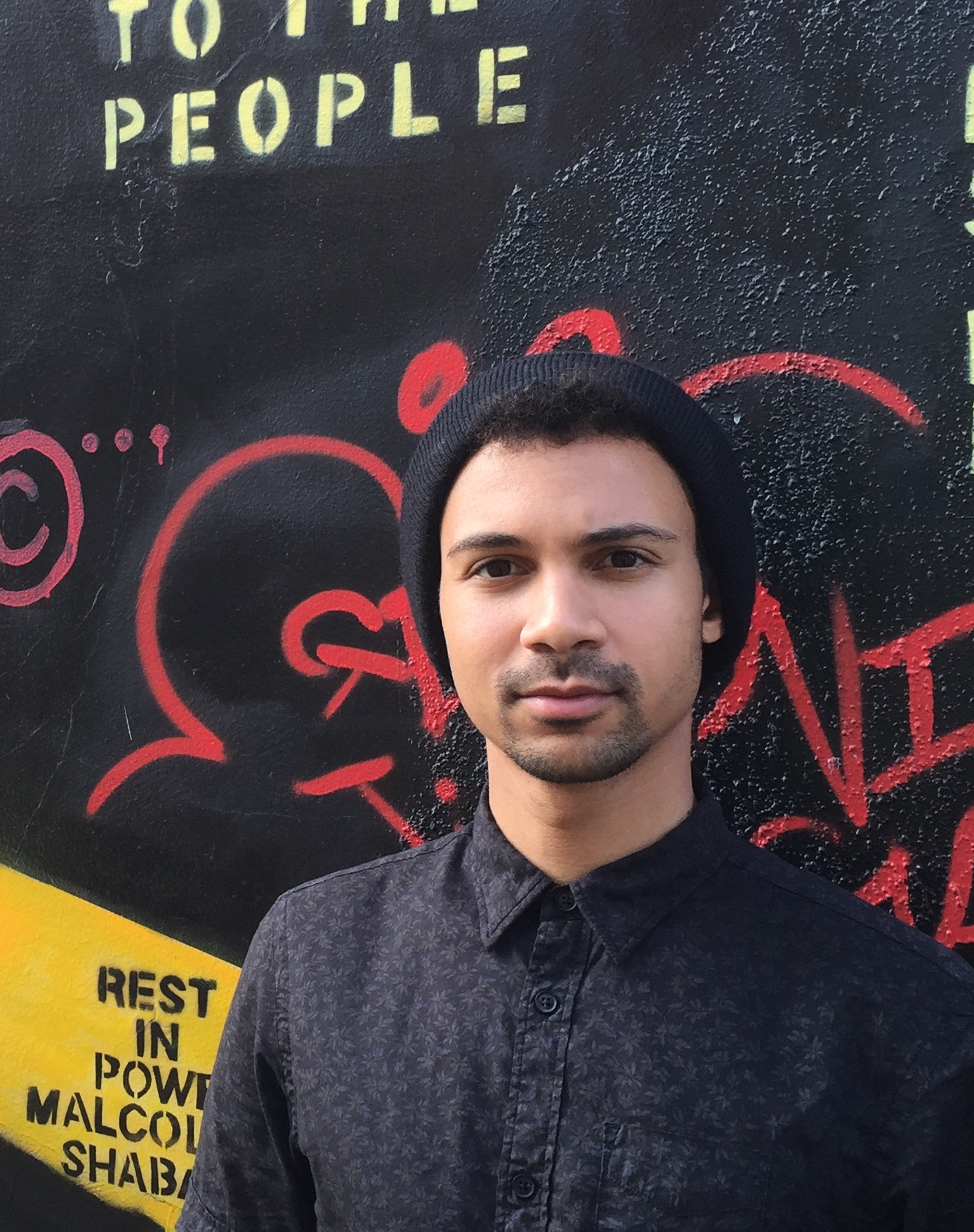
- Born: May 12, 1990 (age 36)
- Education: Stanford University
- Occupations: Policy analyst, activist
- Era: 21st century
- Organization: Mapping Police Violence

Samuel Sinyangwe (born May 12, 1990) is an American policy analyst and racial justice activist. Sinyangwe is a member of the Movement for Black Lives, the founder of Mapping Police Violence, a database of police killings in the United States and the Police Scorecard, a website with data on police use of force and accountability metrics on US police and sheriff's departments. Sinyangwe is also a co-founder of We the Protestors, a group of digital tools that include Campaign Zero, a policy platform to end police violence and a co-host of the Pod Save the People podcast, where he discusses the week's news with a panel of other activists.

== Early life ==
Sinyangwe was born May 12, 1990, to a Tanzanian father and a European Jewish mother who met while studying at Cornell University. He grew up in the College Park neighborhood of Orlando, Florida and attended Winter Park High School in the International Baccalaureate program. He has discussed the influence of his upbringing in Florida, where he was a black child often surrounded by white peers, on his eventual career trajectory; he was shaken and moved to action after the 2013 acquittal of George Zimmerman in the shooting death of Trayvon Martin in Sanford, Florida, where Sinyangwe had regularly attended soccer practice: "I was that kid. I could have been Trayvon. That’s why it hit me so personally and that’s why I realized that needed to be something that took the priority in terms of my focus."

Sinyangwe graduated from Stanford University, where he studied how race intersects with American politics, economics, and class.

== Career ==
Sinyangwe started his career at PolicyLink with the Promise Neighborhoods Institute. As protests emerged in the wake of the 2014 shooting of Michael Brown in Ferguson, Missouri, he connected with Ferguson activists online. With DeRay Mckesson, Brittney Packnett and Johnetta Elzie, he began working to develop policy solutions to address police violence in America. Sinyangwe particularly noticed the absence of official government statistics on police violence and began compiling them from other sources like Fatal Encounters and KilledbythePolice.net, in order to challenge claims about police shootings being rare events or only resulting from resisting arrest.

With other activists, Sinyangwe founded We the Protestors, an organization aimed at developing a set of digital tools to support Black Lives Matter activism. Sinyangwe built projects including a database of police killings, Mapping Police Violence, and a platform of policy solutions to end police violence called Campaign Zero. Sinyangwe also serves as a data scientist for OurStates.org, a project focused on state legislatures and with Mckesson and Brittney Packnett founded the Resistance Manual, an open-source project aimed at connecting anti-racist activists with activists focused on intersecting issues. He has also been responsible for a number of CPRA requests for RIPA-formatted police stops data through the non-profit organization MuckRock.

During the 2016 U.S. Presidential campaign, Sinyangwe and colleagues met with Democratic candidates Bernie Sanders and Hillary Clinton on these policy issues. He has been a vocal critic of the "Ferguson Effect", using data to refute the theory that policing had diminished and crime increased in face of activist scrutiny of police use of force. Melissa Harris-Perry has compared Sinyangwe to journalist and anti-lynching activist Ida B. Wells, noting that Wells began her work by "compil[ing] the data, the social science and research about how, when and where lynchings were happening to begin to make it stop."

Sinyangwe is a co-host of Mckesson's podcast Pod Save the People, which discusses the week's news with a panel of other activists including Mckesson, Packnett and Clint Smith. The podcast particularly focuses on race, grassroots activism, discrimination and other forms of inequality; recommending Pod Save The People in GQ, June Diane Raphael of How Did This Get Made? wrote, "The stories they uplift and think critically about are the ones I'm now wondering why I've never been exposed to/exposed myself to." Sinyangwe has also been featured on CNN, MSNBC, BBC News, FiveThirtyEight, The Los Angeles Times, and other publications. He has written for the Huffington Post and The Guardian.

== Awards and fellowships ==
In 2017, Sinyangwe was named to the Forbes 30 Under 30 list for law and policy. He was also a 2017 Echoing Green Black Male Achievement Fellow.

== Personal life ==
Sinyangwe lives in New York City.

== Selected writings ==
- "Cities That Reduced Arrests For Minor Offenses Also Saw Fewer Police Shootings". FiveThirtyEight. July 26, 2021. Archived from the original on July 26, 2021.
- "Stop Pretending the 'Ferguson Effect' is Real". Huffington Post. May 13, 2016.
- "Giving the 'Ferguson effect' a new name won't make it truer". The Guardian. October 28, 2015.
- "Examining the Role of Use of Force Policies in Ending Police Violence", Police Use of Force Project, September 20, 2016.
