= Derecka Purnell =

American lawyer, writer, and organizer

Derecka Purnell is a lawyer, writer, and organizer. She is best known for her 2021 memoir Becoming Abolitionists, which received positive reviews from Boston Review, PEN America, Kirkus, The Guardian, and others.

== Early life and education ==
Purnell was born and raised in St. Louis, Missouri. She received her bachelor's degree from University of Missouri-Kansas City.

She became politically active in college after the killing of Trayvon Martin, and at the time advocated for police reform. She also organized during the Ferguson Uprising after the death of Michael Brown. Purnell began to study writers such as Rachel Herzing and Ruth Wilson Gilmore, who argue for police abolition. She received her jurisprudence degree from Harvard Law School.

== Career ==
Purnell is a human rights lawyer and writer. She advocates for defunding the police to invest in basic services thought to be the root of crime, such as housing and healthcare. She co-authored the policy proposal #8ToAbolition.

She published her debut book, a memoir called Becoming Abolitionists: Police, Protests, and the Pursuit of Freedom under Astra House in October 2021. She was inspired to write the book after widespread conversation related to prison abolition resulted from the George Floyd protests. The book was selected as a Best Book of 2021 by Kirkus Reviews. Purnell is a columnist for The Guardian, and her writing has appeared in publications such as The New York Times, Teen Vogue, Harper's Bazaar, Cosmopolitan, and In These Times. Purnell is an editor at Hammer & Hope, a magazine of Black politics and culture.

During the coronavirus pandemic, Purnell co-created the COVID19 Policing Project at the Community Resource Hub for Safety Accountability. The Project racks police arrests and harassment through public health orders.

== Awards and recognition ==
Purnell was recognized for her work in 2017 with a National Lawyers Guild Massachusetts Chapter student award. She has also been awarded a fellowship from the Skadden Foundation.

In 2022, the Marguerite Casey Foundation chose Purnell as a Freedom Scholar.

== Personal life ==
Purnell has two children.

== Works ==
- Purnell, Derecka (2021). Becoming Abolitionists: Police, Protests, and the Pursuit of Freedom. Astra House. ISBN 9781662601668.
