= Caroline Hoxby =

American economist

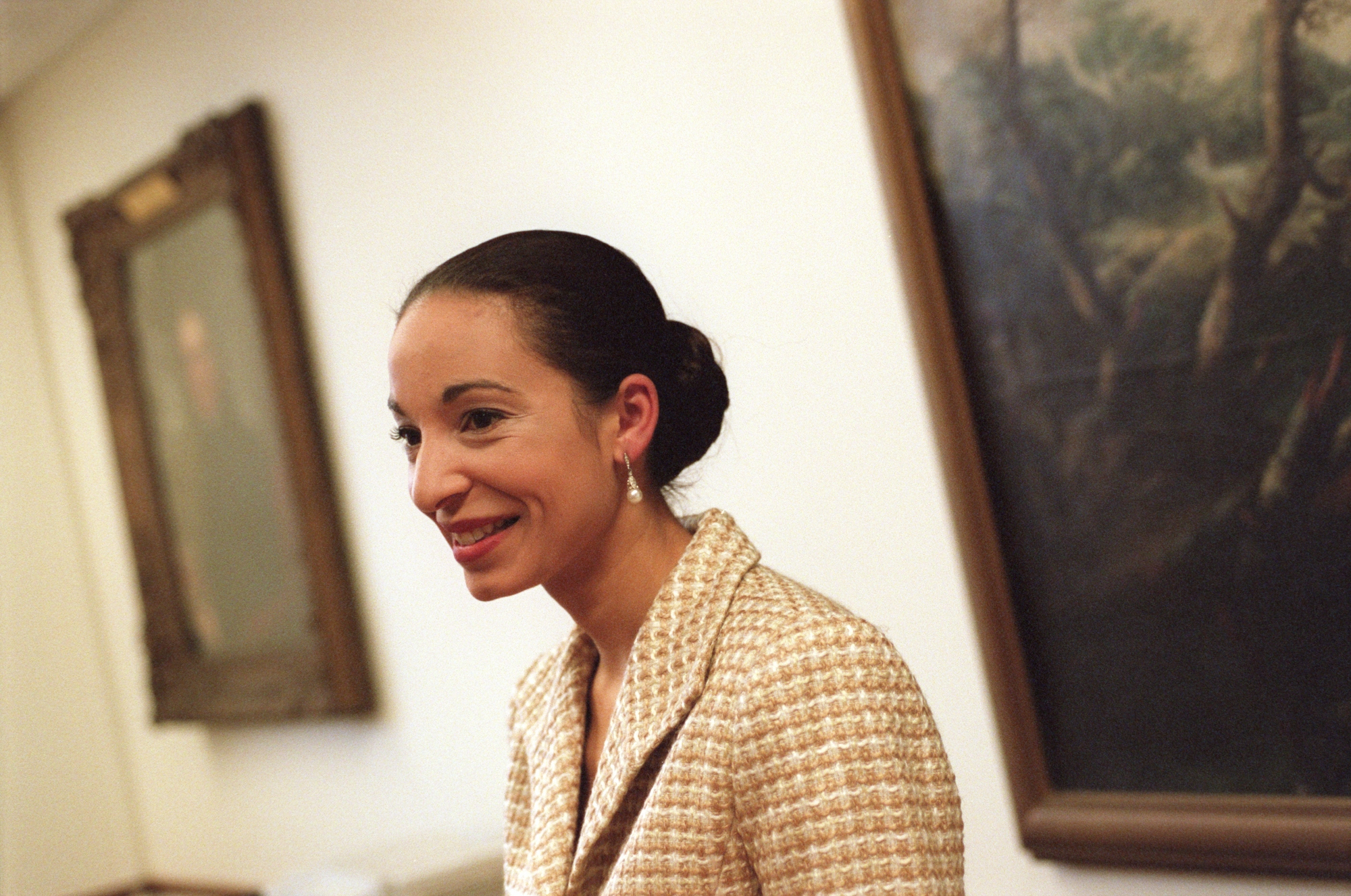
- Born: 1966 (age 59–60)

Academic background
- Education: Harvard University (BA); Magdalen College, Oxford; Massachusetts Institute of Technology (PhD)
- Doctoral advisor: James M. Poterba

Academic work
- Discipline: Labor economics Public economics
- Institutions: Stanford University
- Doctoral students: Jennifer Doleac
- Website: Information at IDEAS / RePEc

Caroline Minter Hoxby (born 1966) is an American economist whose research focuses on issues in education and public economics. She is currently the Scott and Donya Bommer Professor in Economics at Stanford University and program director of the Economics of Education Program for the National Bureau of Economic Research. Hoxby is a John and Lydia Pearce Mitchell University Fellow in Undergraduate Education. She is also a senior fellow at the Hoover Institution and the Stanford Institute for Economic Policy Research.

== Biography ==
Hoxby is a native of Shaker Heights, Ohio, where she attended Shaker Heights High School. Her father, Steven Minter, was the first Under Secretary of Education (at the time, the number 2 position in the U.S. Department of Education) during the presidency of Jimmy Carter. Hoxby graduated summa cum laude and Phi Beta Kappa from Harvard University in 1988, where she won a Hoopes Prize. She then attended Magdalen College, Oxford, on a Rhodes Scholarship. In 1994, she received her doctorate in economics from the Massachusetts Institute of Technology.

From 1994 to 2007, she was a faculty member of Harvard University, first as an assistant professor, then as Morris Kahn Associate Professor of Economics, and starting in 2001 as the Allie S. Freed Professor of Economics. She was the university's only African-American economics professor with tenure. In 2005, she was appointed to be one of the 24 Harvard College Professors. In 2006, she won the Phi Beta Kappa Teaching Prize. She moved to Stanford University in 2007, where she is the Scott and Donya Bommer Professor of Economics. She was named the John and Lydia Pearce Mitchell University Fellow in Undergraduate Education in 2014.

== Personal life ==
She has been married to Blair Hoxby, also a Harvard graduate and a Rhodes Scholar, since 1993. He is currently a faculty member in the English department at Stanford University and does scholarly work on John Milton and Renaissance theater.

In 2014, Caroline Hoxby allegedly injured a Stanford student during an altercation over a noise complaint. At approximately 11 PM on September 26, the Hoxbys were involved in a confrontation at Kappa Sigma where Caroline Hoxby attempted to cut speaker cords with a pair of garden shears. After going after the speaker cords unsuccessfully, she allegedly grabbed a student's ear and twisted it until it bled, yelling "turn the music off right now". The Santa Clara County District Attorney declined to file charges over the matter citing a lack of serious injuries.

== Research ==
Hoxby's research focuses on higher education policy, with an emphasis on elite colleges and universities. Hoxby is a Principal Investigator of the Expanding College Opportunities project, a randomized controlled trial that had dramatic effects on low-income, high achievers' college-going. For work related to this project, she recently received The Smithsonian Institution's Ingenuity Award. Her research in this area began with a demonstration that low-income high achievers usually fail to apply to any selective college. This is despite the fact that they are extremely likely to be admitted and receive such generous financial aid that they usually pay much less to attend selective colleges than they do to attend non-selective schools. This issue is now being addressed systematically owing to the project's evidence that individualized but inexpensive informational interventions cause students to take fuller advantage of their opportunities.

One of Hoxby's most-cited papers, "Does Competition among Public Schools Benefit Students and Taxpayers?" (American Economic Review, 2000), argues that increased school choice improves educational outcomes for all students by improving school quality. Jesse Rothstein published a paper in which he stated that Hoxby's result depended on her hand-count of the main instrumental variable, and that he was unable to replicate her results with any of several alternative measures. Hoxby later published a response in defense of her original work. The debate received coverage in the mainstream press. Hoxby has conducted research in the economics of education, focusing on both higher education and K–12 systems. Her work on the cost of college attributes rising tuition to market competition among U.S. institutions and increased demand for high-quality education. She has examined the organizational autonomy of American universities in areas such as faculty hiring, admissions, and budget control and found this autonomy may contribute to greater research productivity relative to their European counterparts.

Additionally, Hoxby has studied the implications of online education, particularly MOOCs (Massive Open Online Courses), suggesting they may be viable for nonselective institutions but could undermine the financial structures of research-focused universities. She also developed, with co-authors, a method for ranking American undergraduate institutions based on student enrollment choices, using a revealed preference approach.

In the area of K–12 education, Hoxby has analyzed the effects of teachers’ unions, concluding that while unionization is associated with higher expenditures and salaries, it may correspond with reduced productivity in terms of student outcomes. This research generated public debate, including a response from Albert Shanker of the American Federation of Teachers. One of her most cited studies, "Does Competition among Public Schools Benefit Students and Taxpayers?", presents evidence in support of school choice improving student performance.

Her work has also explored the effects of vouchers and charter schools in various U.S. cities. In studies of education reform costs, she estimated that accountability measures are relatively low-cost compared to initiatives like class-size reduction, which her analysis suggests lacks strong causal benefits.

Another frequently cited study, Peer Effects in the Classroom, investigates how classmates' academic achievement influences individual performance, finding notable peer effects, especially within demographic subgroups and classroom gender compositions.

== Selected publications ==
=== Edited books ===
- Caroline M. Hoxby (editor). 2003. The Economics of School Choice. University of Chicago Press. ISBN 978-0-226-35533-7.
- Caroline M. Hoxby (editor). 2004. College Choices: The Economics of Where to Go, When to Go, and How to Pay for It. University of Chicago Press. ISBN 978-0-226-35535-1.
- Jeffrey R. Brown and Caroline M. Hoxby (editors). 2015. How the Financial Crisis and Great Recession Affected Higher Education. University of Chicago Press. ISBN 978-0-226-20183-2. ISBN 978-0-226-20197-9.
- Caroline M. Hoxby (editor). 2008. Higher Aspirations: An Agenda for Reforming European Universities. Bruegel Blueprint Series. ISBN 978-90-78910-07-7.
- Caroline M. Hoxby (author). 2006. The Three Essential Elements and Several Policy Options. Education Forum. ISBN 978-0-9582725-0-6.
- Caroline M. Hoxby (multi-author). 2010. American Education in 2030. Hoover Institution Press.
- Caroline M. Hoxby (multi-author). 2012. Choice and Federalism: Defining the Federal Role in Education. Hoover Institution Press. ISBN 978-0-8179-1484-4.

== Awards and honors ==
The awards and honors that Hoxby has received are:

- Carnegie Fellowship from Carnegie Corporation of New York
- Alfred P. Sloan Research Fellowship, 1999
- National Tax Association Award for Outstanding Doctoral Dissertation in Government Finance and Taxation, 1994
- Global Leader of Tomorrow from the World Economic Forum
- Thomas B. Fordham Prize for Distinguished Scholarship in Education, 2006
- Presented with the Stanford University Economics Department Teacher of the Year Award in 2013.
- Hoxby was the 2013 recipient of Smithsonian magazine's American Ingenuity Award in the Education category.
- Fellow of the American Academy of Arts and Sciences.
