= Benjamin Hansen (economist) =

American economist and the W

- Citizenship: United States

Academic background
- Education: Brigham Young University; University of California at Santa Barbara
- Doctoral advisor: Peter Kuhn, Douglas Steigerwald

Academic work
- Discipline: Economics; Social economics Drug policy
- Institutions: University of Oregon
- Website: https://pages.uoregon.edu/bchansen/; Information at IDEAS / RePEc

Benjamin Hansen is an American economist and the W. E. Miner Professor of Economics at University of Oregon. He is also a research associate at the National Bureau of Economic Research, a research fellow at IZA, and a Research Affiliate at the University of Chicago Crime Lab. He has contributed to the scientific study of cannabis and alcohol policy, as well as crime and labor economics.

== Education and career ==
Benjamin Hansen received his B.A. in Economics from Brigham Young University in 2004, his master's in economics from University of California, Santa Barbara in 2005 and PhD in economics from University of California, Santa Barbara in 2009. He has also worked with the University of Chicago Crime Lab as a Research Affiliate.

== Research and academic work ==
Hansen has published over a dozen articles in peer reviewed academic journals since graduating with his PhD in 2009. These articles have primarily focused on alcohol policy, cigarette policy, cannabis policy, and policing. His work on cannabis policy, in particular, was some of the first studies using natural experiments to investigate the causal impact that medical marijuana legislation had on other types of risky behavior such as drunk driving. Hansen along with D. Mark Anderson and Daniel Rees found that the availability of medical marijuana in a state was apparently associated with a causal reduction in alcohol-related driving and fatalities, suggesting that individuals had been previously using alcohol for self medication. In addition, this suggested that cannabis policy had unintended positive effects due to its substitutability for other types of worse forms of risky behaviors. He, again along with Anderson and Rees found little evidence that marijuana availability from medical marijuana legislation was resulting in increases in adolescent use, suggesting that it was possible for prohibition to be relaxed without spilling over to vulnerable populations.

Much of Hansen's work relates to all forms of risky behaviors, including as mentioned alcohol policy. In an article published in the American Economic Review, Hansen studied the causal effect of driving while intoxicated (DWI) arrests, proxied by blood alcohol content of 0.08 or greater, had on rearrest using a regression discontinuity strategy. He found evidence that stiffer penalties for DWI could in effect reduce rearrest, thus suggesting that alcohol use (or at least, DWIs) were somewhat sensitive to increased penalty, providing one of the few pieces of evidence in support of such a hypothesis.

Hansen has also studied race-based statistical discrimination among prisoner re-entry programs, like ban the box. Former prisoners in many cities must inform potential employers during the job application phase whether they have ever been arrested or convicted. Evidence suggests that these kinds of questions pose major hurdles for prisoners as they attempt to re-enter the labor market. As a result, many states and cities, as well as the federal government, prohibit firms including such questions on applications, requiring such information to be collected later in the application process. Jennifer Doleac and Hansen found that ban-the-box has the unintended effect of introducing statistical discrimination among potential employers. Lacking information on an applicant's criminal background, many employers appear to simply guess at the background using demographic averages, notably race and gender. Doleac and Hansen found strong evidence that the law, while well intentioned, may be reducing employment opportunities among young, low-skilled, black males.

Finally, consistent with his work on alcohol deterrence, Hansen and Gregory DeAngelo produced one of the only studies finding that police are capable of deterrence among drivers through the issuing of speeding tickets. The authors used a natural experiment where the size of the police population shrank as a result of state budgetary constraints. The subsequent decrease in police force resulted in a reduction in police enforcement which caused a statistically significant increase in injuries and highway fatalities. The authors estimated that a single highway fatality can be prevented with approximately $300,000 expenditures on state police.
