= 8 to Abolition =

Police abolition movement

- Material from May 2020
- Formation: May 2020
- Purpose: Police and prison abolition

8 to Abolition is a police and prison abolition resource created during the Black Lives Matter protests of 2020 following the murder of George Floyd.

== Formation ==
8 to Abolition was created in response to the 8 Can't Wait campaign created by Campaign Zero. The co-authors are Mon Mohapatra, Leila Raven, Nnennaya Amuchie, Reina Sultan, K Agbebiyi, Sarah T. Hamid, Micah Herskind, Derecka Purnell, Eli Dru, and Rachel Kuo.

8 to Abolition states that they believe the 8 Can't Wait campaign is "dangerous and irresponsible, offering a slate of reforms that have already been tried and failed, that mislead a public newly invigorated to the possibilities of police and prison abolition, and that do not reflect the needs of criminalized communities."

== Eight points ==
The eight points of 8 to Abolition are as follows:

1. Defund the police
2. Demilitarize communities
3. Remove police from schools
4. Free people from prisons and jails
5. Repeal laws that criminalize survival
6. Invest in community self-governance
7. Provide safe housing for everyone
8. Invest in care, not cops
