= Jennifer Doleac =

American economist

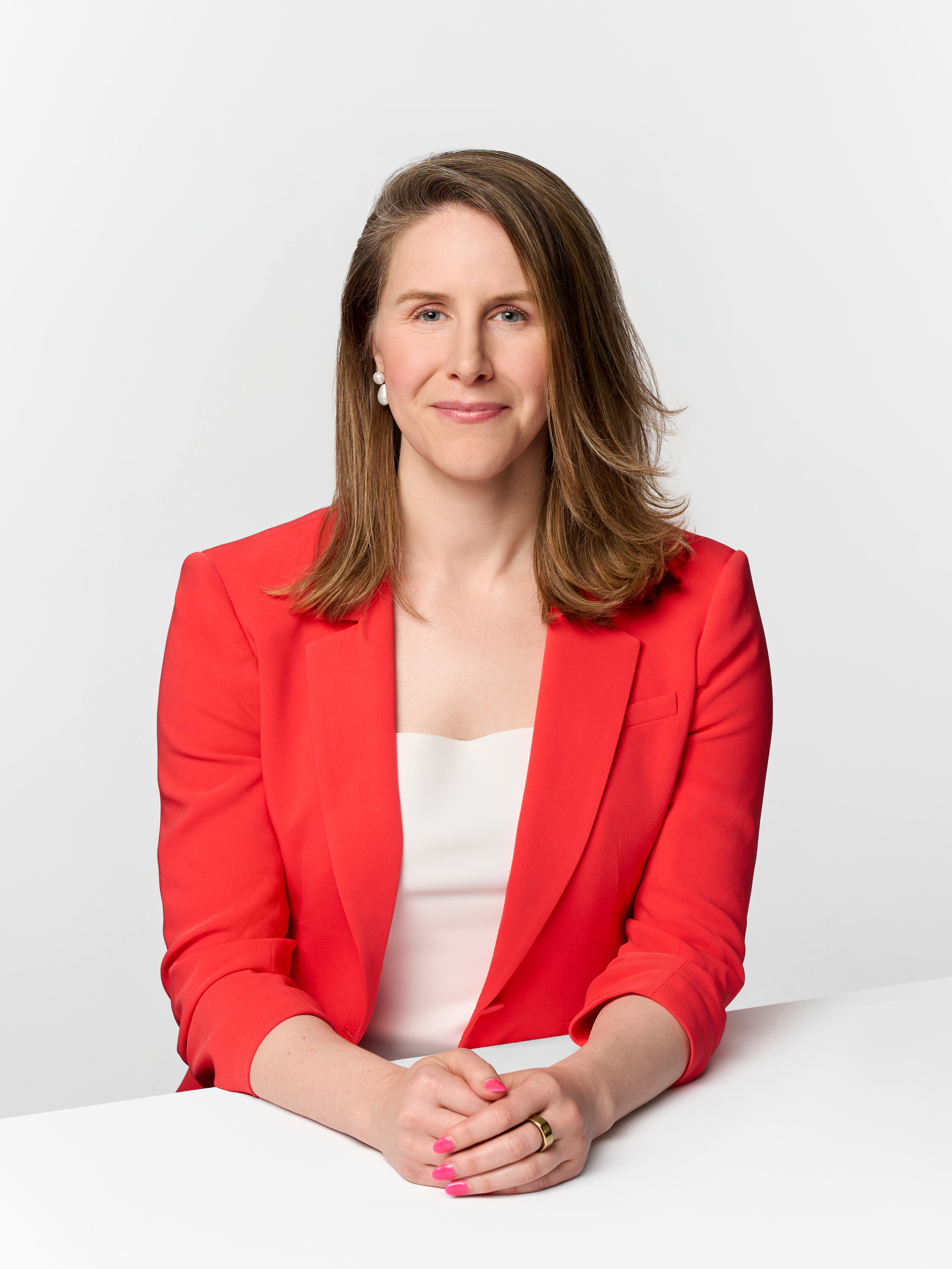
- Portrait photo of Jennifer Doleac
- Education: Williams College (BA); Stanford University (MA, PhD)
- Occupations: Economist; Researcher; Criminal Justice Expert

Academic background
- Doctoral advisor: Caroline Hoxby

Academic work
- Discipline: Economics; Crime and Discrimination
- Institutions: Arnold Ventures
- Website: Official website

Jennifer Doleac is an American economist and fellow at Renaissance Philanthropy. She was previously the executive vice president of criminal justice at Arnold Ventures, and an associate professor at Texas A&M, where she directed the Justice Tech Lab.

Doleac hosts the Probable Causation podcast. In October 2022, Vox named her to their "Future Perfect 50," a list of "scientists, thinkers, scholars, writers, and activists building a more perfect future."

== Education ==
Doleac received her B.A. in economics and mathematics from Williams College in 2003. She completed her Ph.D. in economics from Stanford University in 2012.

== Research and policy career ==
Doleac was part of the faculty of the University of Virginia Batten School of Leadership and Public Policy from 2012 to 2018. She was a visiting fellow at the Brookings Institution in 2015-2016 and then a Nonresident Fellow in Economic Studies. She moved to Texas A&M Department of Economics as an associate professor in 2018. In 2021, Texas A&M named her one of 20 Presidential Impact Fellows at that university.

In 2016, Doleac and economist Benjamin Hansen undertook research into the impact of "ban-the-box" policies: policies that prohibit employers from asking applicants about criminal records on employment application forms. In their research, they examined hiring data for men aged 25 to 34, comparing those living in states that have instituted ban-the-box policies to those living in states that have not. They concluded that the ban-the-box policies had a negative impact on hiring for Black and Hispanic men without college degrees.

In 2023, Doleac was appointed executive vice president of criminal justice at Arnold Ventures.

Doleac's research focuses on the economics of crime and discrimination, with particular interests in prisoner reentry and on policies that affect public safety. Her work includes studies on:

- Employment and Criminal Records: The impact of policies banning employers from asking about job applicants' prior criminal records.
- Daylight Savings: The impact of daylight saving time on crime.
- Criminal Justice Enforcement: The impact of prosecuting non-violent misdemeanor offenses.
- DNA Databases and Crime: The impact increasing DNA databases has on reducing recidivism; DNA databases and reduced crime rates.
- Risk Assessment: The impact algorithmic risk assessments have on sentencing; the consequences of sex offender risk assessment at sentencing

== Controversies ==
=== Harm reduction ===
In 2018, Doleac, then a Brookings expert, released a Brookings blog post with Anita Mukherjee and Molly Schnell which cited work arguing that harm reduction programs face potential trade-offs. Doleac and her co-authors cited work arguing that syringe exchange programs and naloxone distribution could worsen addiction. However, the claims in two of the cited working papers were disputed by public health officials who argued that the cited studies' findings went against previous research on harm reduction. In addition, Doleac and her co-authors were criticized for releasing this information without going through the peer review process, though Brooking's blog posts are not typically peer reviewed.

In response to the criticism, Doleac released a statement through Brookings where she said the public health discipline was filled with researchers who "collectively have so little understanding of rigorous research methods". In another statement, Brookings said that it "does not take positions on issues, nor does [it] endorse Doleac's response to the criticism and feedback she received".

A week after publication, the blog post was amended adding additional studies on supervised-injection sites and naloxone trends. The amendment also contained new paragraphs highlighting that this was an area that required future study.
