= Daniel Rees (economist) =

American economist

Daniel I. Rees is an American economist who currently serves as Professor of Economics at the Universidad Carlos III de Madrid. His research interests presently include health and labour economics.

== Biography ==
Daniel I. Rees earned a B.A. from Oberlin College in 1986, followed by a M.S. in economics from the University of Wisconsin, Madison in 1988 and a Ph.D. in economics from Cornell University in 1992. Rees was a professor at the University of Colorado Denver from 1993 to 2021 and has held visiting appointments at Princeton University's Center for Health and Wellbeing and Queen's University. Currently, he is a professor of economics at Universidad Carlos III de Madrid. He is also a co-editor at Journal of Policy Analysis and Management, a coeditor at the American Journal of Health Economics, and an associate editor at Economic Inquiry. He was an associate editor at Economics and Human Biology from 2011 to 2013 and Editor-in-Chief of the Economics of Education Review from 2014 to 2019. Rees has published in a variety of peer-reviewed journals, including the American Economic Journal: Applied Economics, The Journal of Political Economy, and The Journal of Economic Literature.

== Research ==
Daniel I. Rees' research mainly focuses on health economics and labour economics, especially adolescent health, child health, crime, education, and risky behaviour. According to IDEAS/RePEc, Rees belongs to the top 7% of economists registered on the database. Key findings of his research include the following:

- The abolition of tracking in American schools might strongly increase the educational achievements of lower-track students, though this increase would come at the expense of upper-track students (with Laura Argys and Dominic Brewer).
- Changing some school district leave policies, e.g. increasing the number of unused leave days that teachers can cumulate and "cash in" at retirement may at the same time benefit teachers, students and tax payers (with Ronald Ehrenberg, Randy Ehrenberg, and Eric Ehrenberg).
- Class load characteristics, e.g. class size, number of classes taught, the share of class time spent in areas outside a teacher's certification area - affect job turnover among high school teachers (with Daniel Mont).
- The effects of IQ on earnings in the U.S. are strongly overstated (as e.g. in The Bell Curve) in the absence of controls for family, socioeconomic background, and academic performance, with aspirations, socialization and role models possibly also playing major roles (with Jeffrey Zax).
- Rees, Benjamin Hansen and D. Mark Anderson fail to find any evidence that the legalization of medical marijuana leads to increased marijuana use among teenagers in the U.S.
- For juveniles, increases in violent crime arrests reduce the likelihood of assault among males, of stealing among females, and of selling drugs for both genders, while local poverty and unemployment raise the propensity to commit crimes, and in particular family poverty increases males' propensity to commit robbery, burglary, and theft as well as females' propensity to commit assault and burglary; as these results show that juveniles do respond to incentives and sanctions, employment opportunities, increased family income and stricter deterrence may be effective in reducing juvenile crime (with Naci Mocan).
