= Brittany Packnett Cunningham =

American writer and activist (born 1984)

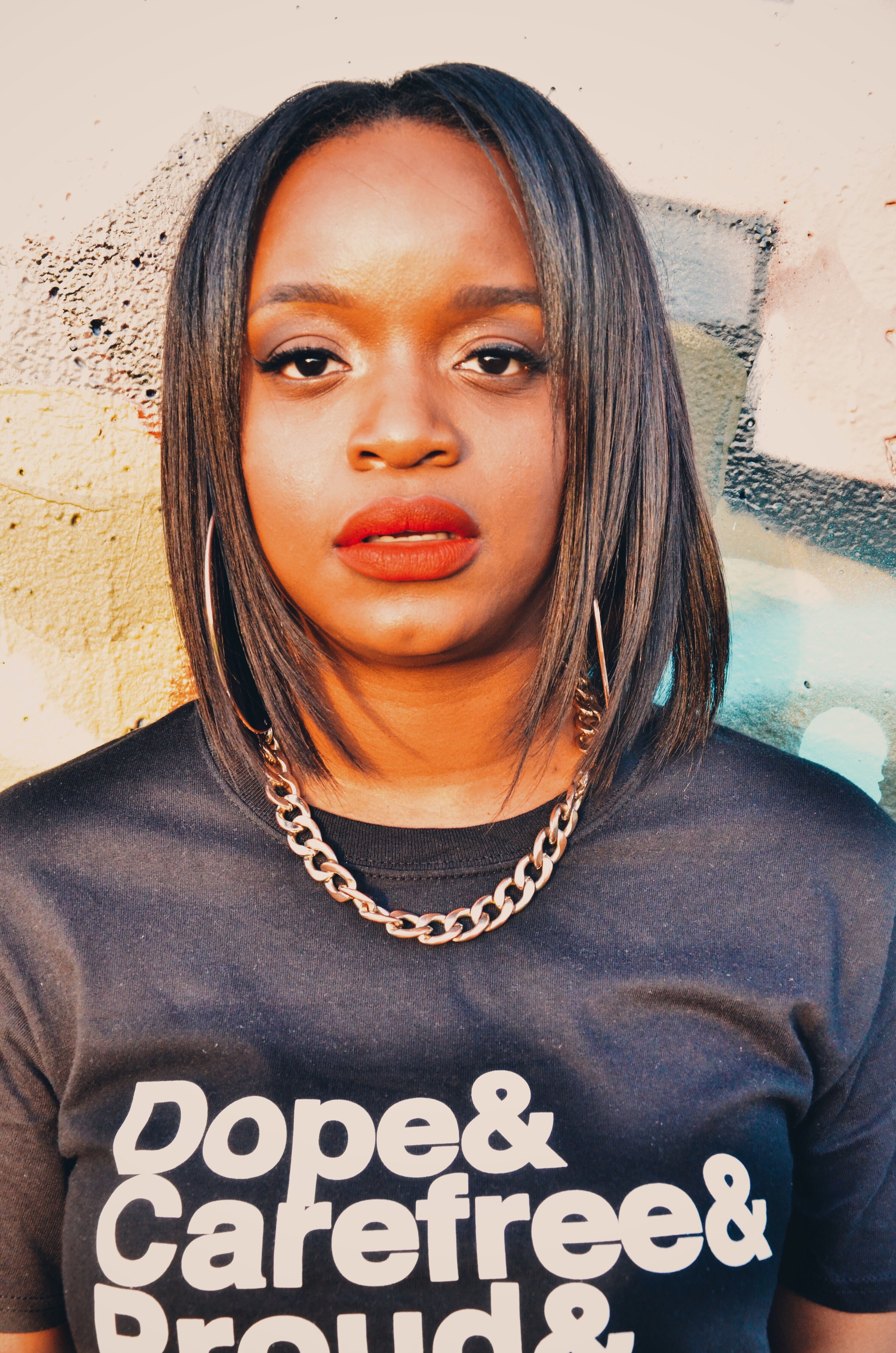
- Born: Brittany N. Packnett; November 12, 1984 (age 41); St. Louis, Missouri, U.S.
- Education: Washington University in St. Louis (BA); American University (MEd)
- Occupations: Activist, non-profit executive, podcast host
- Spouse: Reginald Cunningham (m. 2019)

Brittany N. Packnett Cunningham (born November 12, 1984) is an American activist and the co-founder of Campaign Zero. She served as executive director for Teach for America in St. Louis, Missouri, then as a member of President Barack Obama's Task Force on 21st Century Policing.

== Early life and education ==
Packnett Cunningham was born on November 12, 1984, to Ronald Broadnox Packnett, an ordained Baptist minister in St. Louis, and his wife Gwendolyn. She graduated from John Burroughs School, then earned a Bachelor of Arts degree in African-American Studies at Washington University in St. Louis as an Ervin Scholar, and a master's degree in secondary education from American University.

== Career ==
In 2014, while Packnett was the executive director of Teach for America in St. Louis, she became involved in the protests that erupted after a police officer shot and killed an 18-year-old black man, Michael Brown, in Ferguson, Missouri. She used Twitter and other social media to fight what she called the distorted media narrative of the protests. Packnett became a significant figure of Black Twitter, where she spoke out about education, voting rights, and equal pay.

The Washington Post described Packnett as "heavily involved in the planning and coordination of the Ferguson protest". Missouri Governor Jay Nixon appointed her to serve on the Ferguson Commission established to respond to the unrest.

In the summer of 2015, Packnett cofounded Campaign Zero, a policy platform designed to end police violence. That year, she was appointed to Barack Obama's Task Force on 21st Century Policing, created after the killings of Brown and others drew attention to police brutality. Time magazine named Packnett to a 2015 list of "12 New Faces of Black Leadership." She was also named to The Root magazine's 2015 Root 100 list, described as "the bridge over turbulent, troubled waters." Ebony's 2015 Power 100 included Packnett, Johnetta Elzie, Deray Mckesson, and Samuel Sinyangwe for their work on Campaign Zero.

In 2016, she was promoted to Vice President of National Community Alliances at Teach for America and began the organization's first civil rights and equality campaign.

During the 2016 U.S. presidential election, Packnett endorsed Hillary Clinton for president, saying, "This is not about me. This is about the work. The best way I can use my platform is to support Secretary Clinton."

In a 2017 NPR interview, Packnett encouraged white people to use the essay White Privilege: Unpacking the Invisible Knapsack by Peggy McIntosh as a tool to recognize their white privilege.

During a May 2020 interview on MSNBC about the murder of Ahmaud Arbery, Packnett Cunningham said, "America needs to ask itself why only a viral consumption of black suffering can actually bring action."

During a February 2022 interview on MSNBC about new self-defense legislation proposed in her home state of Missouri, Packnett Cunningham said, "When folks talk about making America great again...They want to return to days when you could lynch or murder Black folks and there would be absolutely no retribution for it. That’s not hyperbole."

== Personal life ==
In 2019, Brittany Packnett married fellow activist Reginald Cunningham in New Orleans. The couple met in 2014 at a protest in their home town of St. Louis. The couple was married at Studio BE, the gallery of artist Brandan "Bmike" Odums', while standing between room-length portraits of Coretta Scott King and Martin Luther King Jr.

Stories of her ancestors were uncovered in an episode of PBS' Finding Your Roots, including the identity of her paternal grandfather, previously unknown to her.
