= DeRay Mckesson =

American activist

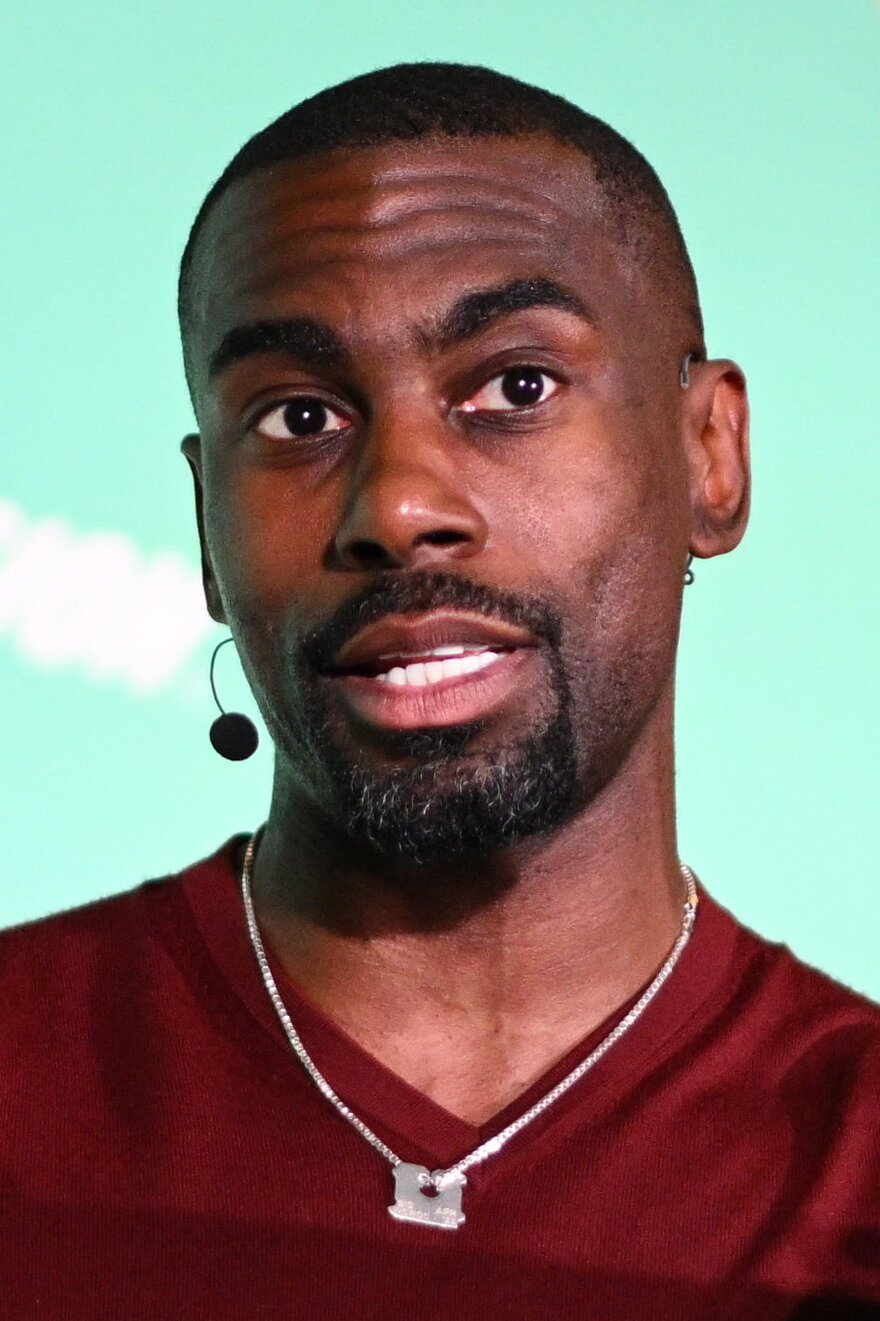
- Mckesson in 2024
- Born: July 9, 1985 (age 41); Baltimore, Maryland, U.S.
- Education: Bowdoin College (BA)
- Occupations: Activist, podcaster

DeRay Mckesson (born July 9, 1985) is an American civil rights activist, progressive podcaster, and former school administrator. An early supporter of the Black Lives Matter movement, he has been active in the protests in Ferguson, Missouri, and Baltimore, Maryland and on social media outlets such as X and Instagram. He has also written for HuffPost and The Guardian. Along with Johnetta Elzie, Brittany Packnett, and Samuel Sinyangwe, Mckesson launched Campaign Zero, a policy platform to end police violence. He is currently part of Crooked Media and hosts Pod Save the People.

On February 3, 2016, Mckesson announced his candidacy in the 2016 Baltimore mayoral election. He finished with 3,445 votes (2.6%), placing sixth in the Democratic Party primary on April 26.

Mckesson is the author of On the Other Side of Freedom: The Case for Hope, a memoir about his life and time as a Black Lives Matter organizer.

== Early life, education, and career ==
Mckesson was an organizer in Baltimore City as a teenager, notably as the Chairman of Youth As Resources, Baltimore's youth-led grant-making organization. He graduated from Catonsville High School in 2003. He then went on to Bowdoin College, where he was president of the student government. Mckesson graduated in 2007 with a degree in government and legal studies.

After graduation, Mckesson began his education career by working for Teach for America for two years in a New York City elementary school. He later worked as special assistant in the office of human capital with the Baltimore City Public Schools, for the Harlem's Children's Zone, and as a human resources official at Minneapolis Public Schools. In June 2016, he was appointed Baltimore City Schools' interim chief human capital officer by district CEO Sonja Santelises.

He has been criticized by some public education advocates for his involvement in Teach for America and for his support for charter schools.

== Activism and politics ==
Mckesson first drove from Minneapolis to Ferguson on August 16, 2014. He began spending all his weekends and vacations in St. Louis. On March 4, 2015, Mckesson announced via Twitter that he had quit his job at Minneapolis Public Schools and had moved to St. Louis.

In April 2015, Mckesson and fellow activists Johnetta Elzie, Samuel Sinyangwe, and Brittany Packnett launched "Mapping Police Violence", which collected data on people killed by police during 2014. In August 2015, the same group launched Campaign Zero, a ten-point policy plan for police reform. Key points included the decriminalization of trespassing, marijuana possession, loitering, public disturbance, and consuming alcohol in public as these crimes do not threaten public safety, but are often used to target African Americans. Mckesson and Elzie were awarded the Howard Zinn Freedom to Write Award in 2015 for their activism.

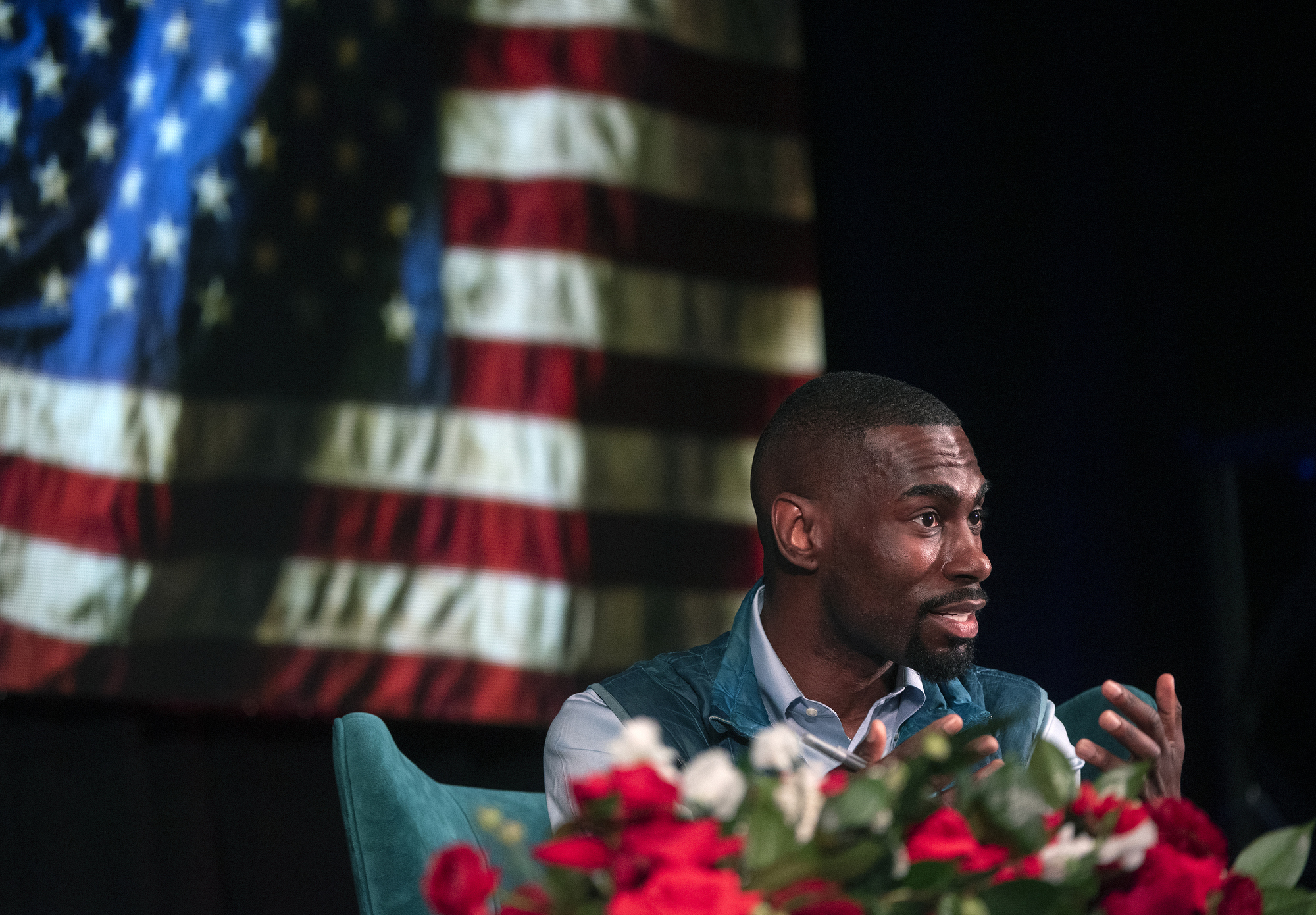
Mckesson in 2019

In June 2015, Mckesson was the focus of a Twitter campaign while he was in Charleston, South Carolina to protest the Charleston church shooting. The campaign featured the hashtag "#GoHomeDeray", which was accompanied by statements demanding that Mckesson leave the city. Mckesson responded to the hashtag, stating that he was there as a sign of solidarity for the nine deaths and that the hashtag was proof that "[r]acism is alive and well in places like South Carolina, and in towns across America."

In late 2015, he was a guest lecturer at Yale Divinity School. In November of the same year, Mckesson spoke at the GLAAD Gala, where he discussed his life as a gay man and asked LGBT people to "come out of the quiet."

In February 2016, Mckesson announced his candidacy for Mayor of Baltimore just before the filing deadline. He placed 6th in the city's Democratic primary in April, with 2.5% of the vote. In June 2016, he was named as interim chief human capital officer of the Baltimore City Public School System.

On July 9, 2016, in the aftermath of the shooting of Alton Sterling, Mckesson took part in a protest in Baton Rouge, Louisiana. While live streaming, he was arrested. He was released the next day after being charged with obstruction of a roadway, and charges were later dropped. On July 13, he and other Black Lives Matter activists, along with police officials, politicians, and other activists, met with President Obama at the White House to discuss relations between black communities and law enforcement officials.

In 2016, Mckesson appeared on The Late Show with Stephen Colbert to have a dialogue about race and education.

Mckesson voted for Bernie Sanders in the primary of the 2016 election, and voted for Hillary Clinton in the general election.

In 2017, Mckesson launched the Pod Save the People podcast, discussing news, culture, social justice, and politics with co-hosts Brittany Packnett Cunningham, Samuel Sinyangwe, Dr. Clint Smith, and guests.

In July 2017, Mckesson, Black Lives Matter, and other BLM leaders were sued by a Baton Rouge policeman who sustained life-altering injuries in an ambush attack, claiming that Black Lives Matter "incited the violence against police in retaliation for the death (sic) of black men shot by police". The suit was dismissed in October 2017; U.S. District Judge Brian Jackson's ruling would be upheld in August 2018 by the U.S. Fifth Circuit Court of Appeals in an unpublished (that is, not precedential) opinion.

Mckesson and Black Lives Matter were also sued by another Baton Rouge police officer who was injured by a thrown rock during a protest on July 9, 2016, when Mckesson had been present. Jackson also dismissed that case in September 2017, ruling that the officer "utterly failed to state a plausible claim" and instead launched a "confused attack" against Black Lives Matter and others. On the same day U.S. District Judge John W. deGravelles approved a settlement awarding up to $1,000 to protesters, including Mckesson, who claim police used excessive force in arresting them.

However on April 24, 2019 the U.S. Fifth Circuit Court of Appeals reversed Jackson's ruling against the officer injured by the rock, allowing that suit to go forward. The ruling stated that: "Given the intentional lawlessness of this aspect of the demonstration, Mckesson should have known that leading the demonstrators onto a busy highway was most nearly certain to provoke a confrontation between police and the mass of demonstrators, and not withstanding, did so anyway. By ignoring the foreseeable risk of violence that his actions created, Mckesson failed to exercise reasonable care in conducting his demonstration." The Supreme Court, in a per curiam order, vacated the Fifth Circuit's decision on November 2, 2020, ruling that the Fifth Circuit failed to review Louisiana state law prior to determining the constitutional aspects, and remanded the case back to the Fifth Circuit for review. However, on March 19, 2026 the Fifth Circuit's three-judge panel reaffirmed that there are grounds for Officer Ford to sue McKesson over potential negligence in organizing the protest that led to his injury. "Eight years of pretrial litigation are enough," said U.S. Fifth Circuit Judge Edith Jones, in her majority opinion, "It is time for Officer Ford to have a jury assess his claim that DeRay McKesson’s negligence in leading a violent protest caused him to suffer injuries at the hands of rioters."

In 2018, a portrait of Mckesson was created for the Smithsonian National Portrait Gallery.

In May 2021, McKesson was awarded an honorary doctorate in humane letters from his alma mater, Bowdoin College.

In January 2024, McKesson demanded the firing of White Baltimore high school principal Eric Eiswert after an AI-generated forgery of the principal's voice purportedly showed him making racist comments. McKesson stated, "Eric Eiswert was my social studies teacher and then the SGA Advisor at Catonsville High School and I am in no way surprised by his comments in this recording. He should be fired immediately and his Maryland teaching and administrator licenses should be permanently revoked." It was later revealed that Principal Eiswert conducted no wrongdoing, and the high school's Black athletic director, Dazhon Darien, created the recordings with artificial intelligence. Mr. Darien received four months in jail after pleaing guilty to Disturbing School Operations.

== Books ==
- On the Other Side of Freedom (2018) ISBN 978-0525560326

== See also ==
- Ferguson unrest
- 2015 Baltimore protests
- Mckesson v. Doe
