= Johnetta Elzie =

American activist (born 1989)

- Born: April 16, 1989 (age 37); United States
- Other name: Netta
- Education: Our Lady of Good Counsel, Southeast Missouri State
- Occupations: Activist, community organizer
- Known for: Ferguson protests

Johnetta "Netta" Elzie (born April 16, 1989) is an American civil rights activist. She is one of the leaders in the activist group We The Protesters and co-edits the Ferguson protest newsletter This Is the Movement with fellow activist DeRay Mckesson.

== Early life ==
Elzie grew up in North County St. Louis, where her mother owned a hair salon. Elzie attended Our Lady of Good Counsel, a private school where she was often the only black student in her class. She then studied journalism in college at Southeast Missouri State.

== Civil rights activism ==
Elzie became involved in activism following the shooting of Michael Brown. On August 9, 2014, via Twitter, Elzie learned of Brown's death and that his body was left for hours in the street a short distance from her own childhood home. Mourning the recent death of her own mother, Elzie drove to the site of Brown's death and began tweeting about the scene she encountered. She became involved in protests and in organizing volunteers and donations, as well as in continuing to document events; in his book They Can't Kill Us All, Washington Post reporter Wesley Lowery described Elzie as "the most prominent of the citizen journalists telling the story of Ferguson."

Elzie has been active in the Ferguson, Missouri and Baltimore, Maryland protests and she, with Mckesson and data scientist Samuel Sinyangwe, created "Mapping Police Violence", which collected data on people killed by police during 2014.

The Los Angeles Times has named Elzie to its list of "The new civil rights leaders: Emerging voices in the 21st century." The New York Times profiled Elzie and McKesson as leaders of the group that built "the nation's first 21st-century civil rights movement." In January 2015 The Atlantic named her one of the leaders of the Black Lives Matter Movement.

Elzie uses social media outlets such as Twitter in her activism.

She has been a field organizer for Amnesty International, and has volunteered with a girls' group called the Sophia Project in St. Louis.

== Honors ==
Elzie and McKesson were awarded the Howard Zinn Freedom to Write Award from the New England branch of PEN in 2015 for their activism.

They were also named as two of the 53 people on Fortune's 2015 list of "World’s Greatest Leaders."

== See also ==
- Ferguson unrest
- 2015 Baltimore protests
- Black Lives Matter Movement
