= Gort cloud =

2009 book and green marketing concept

The Gort Cloud: The Invisible Force Powering Today's Most Visible Green Brands is a 2009 book by branding expert Richard Seireeni. The book explores the marketing and brand-building experiences of sustainable businesses in America and introduces the concept of the "gort cloud".

Within the context of the book, the gort cloud is defined as a vast, largely invisible, and environmentally-aware community that evaluates and exchanges information regarding environmental (green) products and services.

== Concept and structure ==
Seireeni coined the term to describe a specific type of green network with inherent social value. The community is described as encompassing a wide variety of actors, including:

- NGOs and government agencies
- Certifying groups and academics
- Eco-tech specialists and sustainable designers
- Business alliances and special interest groups
- Green media, blogs, and trendspotters

The book posits that this network functions similarly to a traditional social network, where nodes (individuals or organizations) are tied by interdependencies such as shared values and visions. In the case of the gort cloud, the shared goal is the promotion of sustainable and socially responsible goods and services, and the decreased use of unsustainable alternatives. Relying on Robert Putnam's theories of social capital, the book argues that these green social contacts increase collective productivity in the environmental sector.

=== Function and examples ===
Seireeni contrasts the gort cloud with purpose-built social network services of the late 2000s, such as Facebook or MySpace. While those platforms were designed to build online communities around shared interests, the gort cloud was not consciously created or controlled by any single organization. Instead, it is described as a fluid, interconnected group united by the common cause of planetary health.

The book illustrates the power of this network through contemporary examples, such as the 2008 marketing campaign for The Green Collar Economy by Van Jones. By utilizing a viral marketing strategy targeted specifically at this green community and environmental organizations like Green For All, Jones successfully pushed his book to number 12 on The New York Times Best Seller list during its first week of publication.

=== Vetting process ===
According to the concept, the gort cloud acts as an informal peer review system for green businesses. When a new eco-friendly product or service is introduced, experts and non-experts within the community investigate the company's claims and check facts to prevent "greenwashing". While heavily reliant on the Internet and email, the network also utilizes traditional book publishers, magazines, radio, television, and in-person green trade shows to communicate and vet products.

== Etymology ==
Seireeni notes in the book that the inspiration for the name comes from the Oort cloud, a vast field of stellar debris orbiting the Solar System, named after astronomer Jan Hendrik Oort. Because the Oort cloud is invisible to the naked eye and can only be detected electronically or by the occasional comet it sends toward Earth, Seireeni found it a fitting metaphor for the vast, largely invisible green network that heavily influences the evolution of green business.

== Images ==
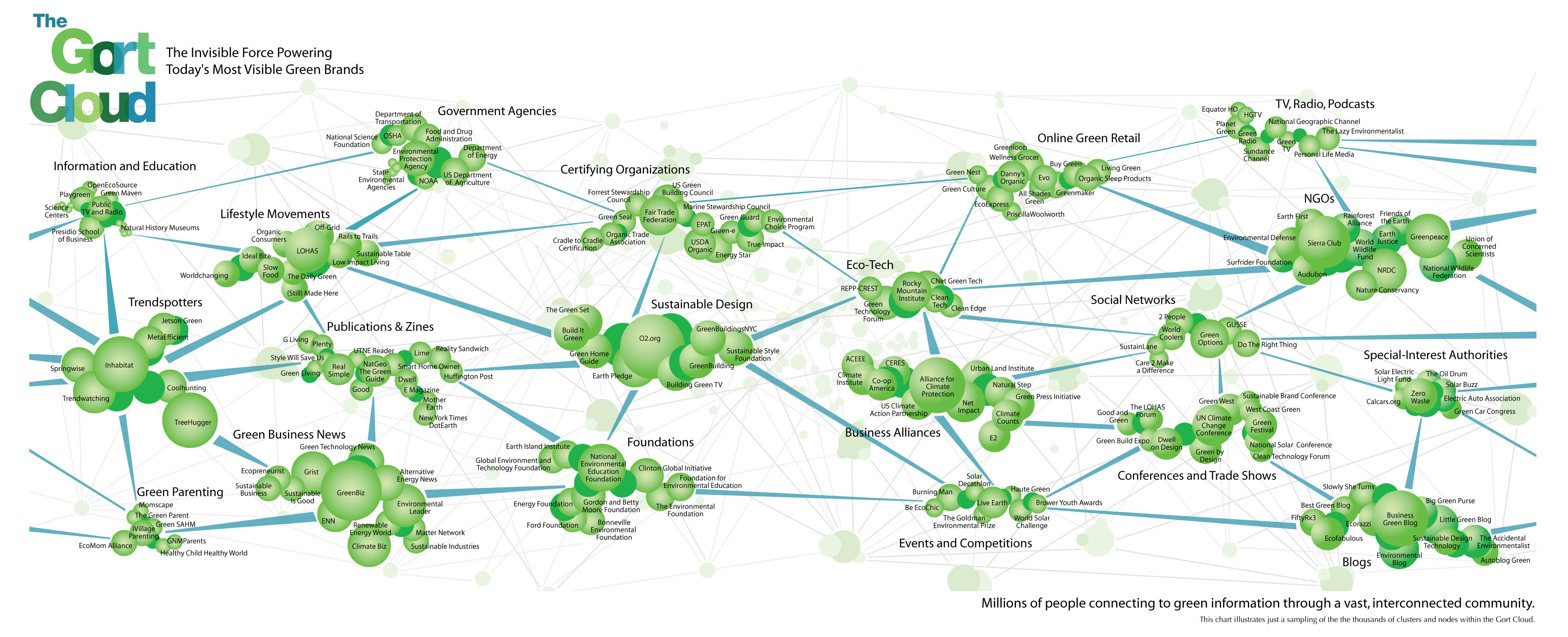
The Gort Cloud
