= Movement for Black Lives =

Coalition of U.S. racial justice groups

- Nickname: M4BL
- Formation: July 2015; 11 years ago
- Founded at: Cleveland, Ohio
- Type: Coalition of activist organizations
- Members: 50 organizations: Black Lives Matter Global Network Foundation; Ella Baker Center for Human Rights; National Conference of Black Lawyers
- Website: m4bl.org

The Movement for Black Lives (M4BL) is a coalition of more than 50 groups representing the interests of Black communities across the United States. Members include the Black Lives Matter Network, the National Conference of Black Lawyers, and the Ella Baker Center for Human Rights. They are endorsed by groups such as Color of Change, Race Forward, Brooklyn Movement Center, PolicyLink, Million Women March Cleveland, and ONE DC, and the coalition receives communications and tactical support from an organization named Blackbird.

On July 24, 2015 the movement first convened at Cleveland State University where between 1,500 and 2,000 activists gathered to participate in open discussions and demonstrations. The conference initially attempted to "strategize ways for the Movement for Black Lives to hold law enforcement accountable for their actions on a national level". However, the conference resulted in the formation of a much more significant social movement. At the end of the three days conference, on July 26, the Movement for Black Lives initiated a year long "process of convening local and national groups to create a United Front". This year long process ultimately resulted in the establishment of an organizational platform that articulates the goals, demands, and policies for which the Movement for Black Lives supports in order to achieve the "liberation" of black communities across America. Following the murder of George Floyd, M4BL released the BREATHE Act, which called for sweeping legislative changes surrounding policing. The policy bill included calls to divest from policing and reinvest funds directly into community resources and alternative emergency response models. In 2020, the Movement for Black Lives released policy demands in response to the COVID-19 pandemic.

== Organization ==
The Movement for Black Lives was described by Deva Woodly, a Professor of Politics at The New School, during the George Floyd protests as "an umbrella organization that consists of a coalition of movement organizations across the nation" which allowed people to "connect the dots between the symptoms of the present crisis and their structural causes."

=== Platform and statements ===
The movement's platform, published in August 2016, entitled A Vision for Black Lives: Policy Demands for Black Power, Freedom and Justice, has six demands:

1. End the war on black people.
2. Reparations for past and continuing harms.
3. Divestment from the institutions that criminalize, cage and harm black people; and investment in the education, health and safety of black people.
4. Economic justice for all and a reconstruction of the economy to ensure our communities have collective ownership and not merely access.
5. Community control of the laws, institutions and policies that most impact us.
6. Independent black political power and black self-determination in all areas of society.

M4BL believes that reparations are a possible and credible goal, precedented by reparations paid to African-American farmers in 2012.

Movement for Black Lives supports prison abolition, having issued a statement calling for an "End to All Jails, Prisons, and Immigration Detention".

In 2023-2024, it released the statement "we demand an immediate ceasefire and end to the U.S.–backed occupation of Palestine," committing to resisting the genocide of Gaza."

=== Funding and institutional support ===
Shortly after the movement published its platform in 2016, 50 organizations had registered their support. One major endeavor was the establishment by philanthropic organization Borealis Philanthropy of the Black-Led Movement Fund (BLMF). Designed to support the work of M4BL, the BLMF is both a pooled donor fund aiming to bring $100 million to the movement and an initiative aimed at helping the movement build organizational capacity.

== Major events ==
=== Cleveland State University protests ===
On July 24, 2015, individuals from across the country gathered at Cleveland State University in response to incidents of police brutality against the African-American community. Specifically, the deaths of individuals such as Michael Brown, Eric Garner, and Tamir Rice, sparked a need for the conference among the African-American community. During the three day conference (July 24–26), activists participated in discussions, viewed short films and engaged in workshops designed to mobilize individuals seeking to find solutions to the problems that black communities face. The Cleveland State University convention is considered the first major gathering of the Movement for Black Lives, with more than 1,500 individuals attended the conference. Subsequently, activists from the convention embarked on a mission to establish the official Movement for Black Lives organization, as well as establish a policy platform that could guide activists from around the country in their fight to end police brutality and discrimination against blacks within the United States.

The conference gained even more national media attention when, on the last day of the convention, a Cleveland Regional Transit Authority (RTA) officer maced a crowd of primarily African-American activists just blocked away from Cleveland State University. The crowd had gathered in response to an RTA officer's detention of an African-American teen for intoxication. According to authorities, the teenager was unable to "care for himself" due to his level of intoxication and thus the authorities thought it was necessary to take him into custody. During the teenager's detention, a crowd gathered around the police cruiser to protest the detention of the teen; in order to clear the crowd from the path of the police cruiser, "a Transit Police officer used a general burst of pepper spray" directed toward the activists. The incident drew criticism as interest groups, such as the ACLU of Ohio, believed "the use of pepper spray by law enforcement as a means of crowd control is questionable."

=== Professional sports demonstrations ===
Athletes across American professional sports have demonstrated their support for the movement through various demonstrations and protests. In 2016, professional football player Colin Kaepernick elected to kneel during the playing of the national anthem at an NFL football game. During post-game interviews, Kaepernick explained, "I am not going to stand up to show pride in a flag for a country that oppresses black people and people of color." Kaepernick and other NFL player activists received intense criticism for their pre-game protests throughout the 2016 season, including criticism from Supreme Court Justice Ruth Bader Ginsburg who said, "Would I arrest them for doing it? No... I think it's dumb and disrespectful." Although Kaepernick's protest received mixed criticism, it unequivocally brought increased salience to the discussion around of black lives within the United States.

Players from other American professional sports, such as the National Basketball Association, have also participated in demonstrations to support the Movement for Black Lives. In 2016, professional basketball players LeBron James, Chris Paul, Dwyane Wade, and Carmelo Anthony took center-stage at the ESPY's to deliver a "call to action" in response to the shootings of both Philando Castile and Alton Sterling, as well as the deaths of five police officers that were slain earlier that month. The four NBA stars saw it as an opportunity to bring individuals on both sides of the Movement for Black Lives together. Former Miami Heat shooting guard, Dwyane Wade, stated, "Racial profiling has to stop... but also the retaliation has to stop. Enough is enough." The group further encouraged Americans to "renounce all violence" and instead, focus their efforts on rebuilding the divided communities within America.

=== Strike for Black Lives ===
On July 20, 2020, the Movement for Black Lives was one of 60 organizations, including several dozen trade unions, that organized the Strike for Black Lives. As part of the ongoing George Floyd protests and the larger Black Lives Matter movement, the strike consisted of a nationwide walkout involving thousands of workers protesting for racial and economic justice.

== Reception ==
Organizations such as the National Council of Asian Pacific Americans, ACLU of Northern California, and the National Council of Jewish Women showed support for the Movement for Black Lives by issuing public statements following the movement's controversial publication of its platform. The Movement for Black Lives' call for criminal justice reform and the end of police brutality resonated with many advocacy groups. In one statement, the National Council of Jewish Women stated, "NCJW affirms that Black lives matter, including Jews of color, who are a vital part of both the Jewish and our NCJW community. We recognize that the Black and Jewish communities are inextricably linked and our struggles for social justice are connected."

The Movement for Black Lives received further support from Democracy for America following the release of its policy platform. One of the primary goals of the Movement for Black Lives is to promote a democracy that is more representative of black communities in America. Various political organizations have stood in solidarity with M4BL because, according to Democracy for America, it is seen as "an ideal catalyst for the substantive, results-oriented conversations the current and future leaders of the Democratic Party must have with the communities they serve". Furthermore, the Movement for Black Lives' goals to promote economic, political, and social change provide a "solid blueprint" for future legislators as they seek to further understand and resolve the problems that exist within the black community.

In 2016, the Ford Foundation partnered with Borealis Philanthropy, an intermediary organization, to set up a "Black-Led Movement Fund" with the stated intention to "bring $100 million in new resources to the Movement for Black Lives". Although Ford Foundation decided to no longer move forward with their investment, they still award millions to organizations in support of racial justice. BLMF has been able to award small grants to several organizations within the Movement for Black Lives. By Fall 2020, Borealis Philanthropy awarded $5.4 million to grassroots organizations in support of M4BL.

There was widespread negative reaction among Jewish organizations to the Movement for Black Lives' 2016 platform, wherein the M4BL stated that "[the] US justifies and advances the global war on terror via its alliance with Israel and is complicit in the genocide taking place against the Palestinian people", that "Israel is an apartheid state", and that "[the] US [has funded an] apartheid wall".

In August 2020, the Movement for Black Lives together with over 100 left-wing organizations, including the Council on American-Islamic Relations, Jewish Voice for Peace and Jews for Racial and Economic Justice, signed an open letter calling for cutting ties with the Anti-Defamation League (ADL) due to their support of Israel. Some consider this open letter, and other criticisms of the ADL and Israel to be anti-semitic.
