= Rinku Sen =

Indian-American activist and author

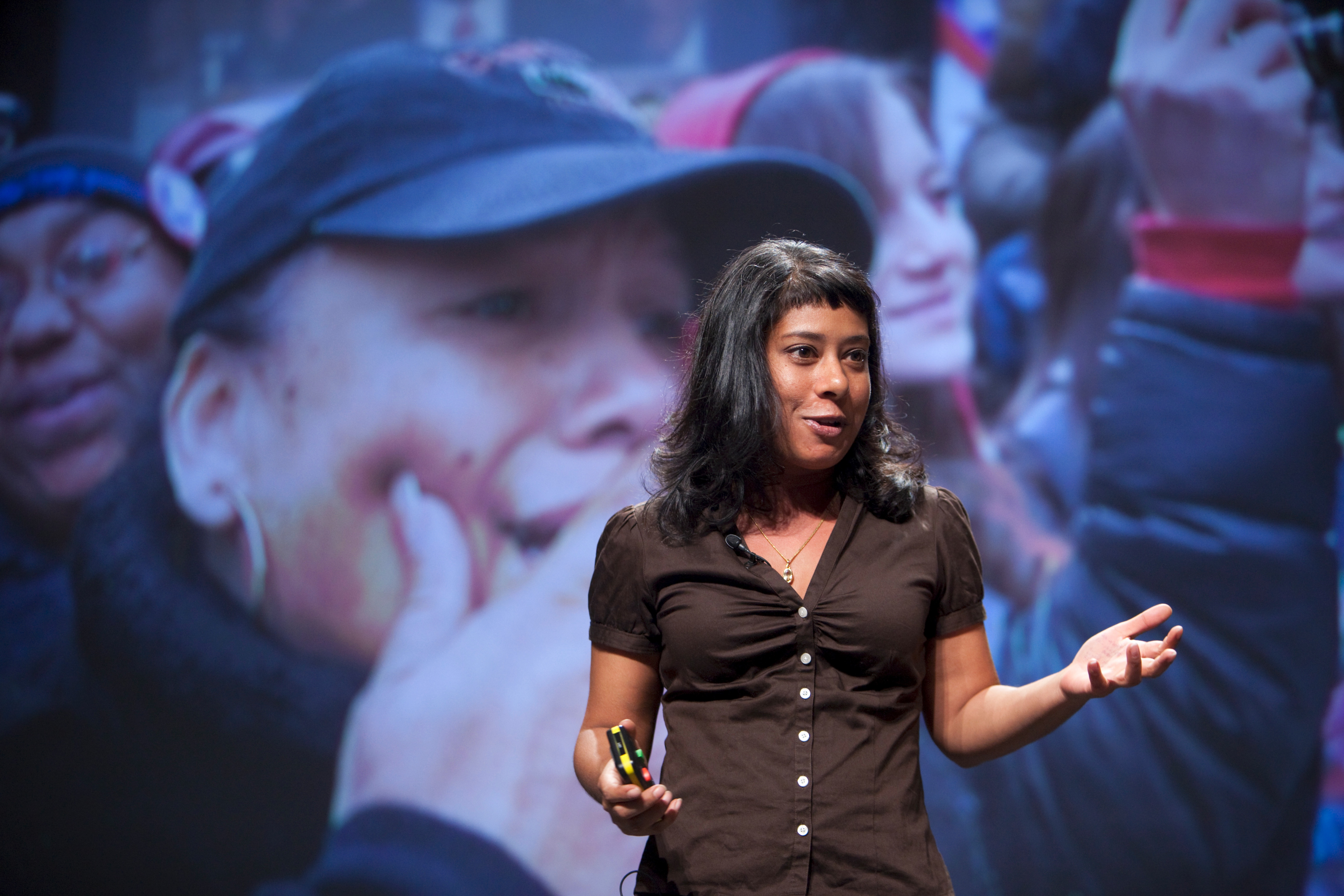
- Sen at PopTech in Camden ME in 2009
- Education: Brown University; Columbia University Graduate School of Journalism
- Website: rinkusen.com

Rinku Sen is an Indian-American author, activist, political strategist and the executive director of Narrative Initiative. She is also the co-president of the Women’s March Board of Directors. Sen is the former president and executive director of the racial justice organization Race Forward and publisher of ColorLines.com and Mother Jones magazine.

== Early life and education ==
Sen was born in Calcutta, India before her family moved to upstate New York when she was five years old. She was raised in New York State and received a B.A. in Women's Studies from Brown University in 1988 and an M.S. in Journalism from Columbia University in 2005. During an interview with NBC News, she recalls how her earliest recollections of her life in India were tinged by race. She grew up in predominantly white neighborhoods and spent her childhood trying to fit in with her peers.

She was a student activist at Brown University fighting against race, gender, and class discrimination. This is where she started learning how to organize. She was a coordinator for the United States Student Association where she trained other student organizers. She went on to join the Center for Third World Organizing as a trainer and went through their Movement Activist Apprenticeship.

== Career ==
She has written two books. Her first book, Stir It Up: Lessons in Community Organizing (Jossey-Bass) was commissioned by the Ms. Foundation for Women and released in the fall of 2003. Her second book, The Accidental American: Immigration and Citizenship in the Age of Globalization (Berrett-Koehler) was released in September 2008, winning the Nautilus Book Awards Silver Medal, as well as a Finalist for the ForeWord Magazine 2008 Book of the Year Award (May 2009), and the 2009 IPPY Book Awards in "Current Events" Bronze Medal (May 2009). She drafted the Shattered Families report, shedding light on the number of children who are in foster care as a result of their parents being deported. She led the Drop the I-Word Campaign which prompted media outlets including the Associated Press, USA Today, and LA Times to stop using the word "illegal" when referring to immigrants. Rinku has also worked as a political strategist with other organizations and foundations, including PolicyLink, the ACLU and the Nathan Cummings Foundation.

== Honors and awards ==
In 1996, Ms. Magazine named her one of 21 feminists to watch in the 21st century and she was named in 2008 by Utne Reader as one of 50 Visionaries who are changing the world.
