= Hip-hop activism =

Conceptual activist movement

Hip hop activism is a term coined by the hip hop intellectual and journalist Harry Allen. It is meant to describe an activist movement of the post- baby boomer generation.

The hip hop generation was defined in The Hip- Hop Generation: Young Blacks and the Crisis in African American Culture as African Americans born between 1965 and 1984. This group is situated between the passage of the Civil Rights Act and the assassination of Malcolm X on one end and hip hop's explosion during the 1970s and 1980s. But the hip-hop generation can be more loosely defined to include all people born between 1965 and 1984 who have grown up within a culture of hip hop music, dance, fashion and art.

Some of the issues of social justice the movement addresses are minority and immigration rights, educational access, prison reform and transportation policy. In recent years California's Proposition 187 and Proposition 21 have also been a focus of hip hop activism. The movement also addresses a broad range of social change practices like youth organizing and development, cultural work, and intercultural exchanges.

== Evolution and context ==
The mid-seventies was the beginning of the post- Civil Rights Movement, and it was also the start of hip-hop music. American society was under a new, more insidious kind of state violence. The growth of drugs and violence resulted in an increase in youth arrests. In areas like South Bronx, the United States turned a blind eye to black and Latino youth. This is where the, "somethin' outta nothin," mentality was developed, and the way it was developed was through rapping or MCing. Hip-hop was paired with other forms of expression that emerged from this DJing, break dancing, and graffiti writing were all ways that stories of harsh American reality were told by the youth.

The mid-1990s were a particularly active period for the hip-hop agenda. In 1994, C. Delores Tucker told a Senate panel that the hip-hop generation, "coaxed by gangster rap,' would "trigger a crime wave of epidemic proportions that we have never seen the likes of." And then added, "Regardless of the number of jails built, it will not be enough."

In his book Can't Stop Won't Stop, author Jeff Chang traces the evolution of the hip hop activist movement noting that it was initially mostly grass roots and locally focused. But as movements against the prison-industrial complex and police brutality emerged simultaneous to movements against corporate globalization, many young hip hop activists began to organize nationally.

As hip hop has become a globalized art form, hip hop's progressive, activist agenda has traveled with it around the world. Organizers in Paris, Cape Town, Sweden, New Zealand, Chile, and other countries have employed the tools of hip hop to work for change in communities, empower youth and give voice to unchecked issues. While gangster rap has been blamed by cultural critics for triggering crime waves, hip hop activism has stood up against the prison industrial complex, addressed environmental racism (many went on to encompass green politics) and corrupt systems that cause poverty around the world. Global hip hop activism does not only employ rap music, but also works within the other pillars of hip hop, such as creating youth empowerment projects by teaching graffiti art or break dancing. In the favelas of Rio de Janeiro, a movement called Afro-Reggae was started by former drug dealers to help keep favela children out of the drug trade by teaching them to be emcees and break dancers. The movement gained international fame in the documentary "Favela Rising".

The Anti-Injustice Movement (aka The AIM) is a rapidly expanding international hip-hop activist movement composed of political emcees (aka 'raptivists'), protest poets, DJs, street dancers, graffiti writers and activists who are fighting many forms of global injustice via peaceful and creative means.

== California Propositions 187 and 21 ==
A significant factor in the national organizing of hip-hop activist in recent years can be attributed to legislation passed in response to waves of migration and immigration from Central and South America. This legislation included Proposition 187, which ended affirmative action and bilingual education in California, and Proposition 21, which demanded tougher sentencing and longer incarceration for juvenile offenders. Opponents like Paul Johnston claim that Proposition 187 has only served to increase political, cultural and class factions while marginalizing specific minority populations. In his essay The Emergence of Transnational Citizenship Among Mexican Immigrants in California Johnston notes the cultural tensions created by the new legislation. He explains,

"These measures failed to halt the flow of undocumented workers to the United States, from Mexico as well as the traumatized Central American communities to the south. Instead, they quickly consolidated a deep divide in the social structure of the state, based on differences in citizenship status. The growth of this population, its increasingly criminalized and vulnerable status, and its impoverished, furtive, marginalized way of life under the new anti-immigrant policy regime has created circumstances that might fairly be described as a new apartheid in California."

Despite criticism the measures were passed and are supported by many Californians and their politicians. The discontent the legislation spurred, however, continues to be a focus of hip hop activists throughout the United States.
