= Dream.Org =

American non-profit legal organization

- Formation: 2007; 19 years ago
- Founders: Van Jones
- Type: Nonprofit
- Purpose: Justice reform; Prison reform; Climate Change; Poverty
- Location: United States
- Methods: Policymaking; Advocacy; Lobbying
- Subsidiaries: Green for All
- Website: www.dream.org

Dream.Org (previously known as Dream Corps) is a non-profit organization founded by Van Jones. It was founded based on "reaching across political divides to bring justice, and environmental and technological change to underrepresented populations". The organization works through three programs – Green, Justice and Tech — to combat climate change, disrupt mass incarceration, and create economic opportunities in overlooked communities.

== History ==
Jessica Jackson and Matt Haney met Van Jones during a chance meeting and began talking with him about criminal justice reform. Over breakfast they scribbled ideas on a napkin which later led to the formation of #cut50.

In 2015, Jackson, Haney, and Jones joined to co-found #cut50, an organization focused on bipartisan solutions to criminal justice reform issues. As #cut50, Dream Corps worked alongside members of Congress, and the Trump Administration to develop and pass the First Step Act of 2018.

In 2021, Jeff Bezos reportedly gave Dream.org US$100,000,000 (equivalent to $118,813,705 in 2025) as a donation.

Since 2021, Dream.Org Justice (formerly known as #cut50) has advocated for passage of the Eliminating a Quantifiably Unjust Application of the Law (EQUAL) Act to eliminate sentencing disparities between crack and powder cocaine.

On Oct 16, 2024, Dream.Org held its inaugural "We, the Dream" gala, granting awards to Sheriff Eric S. Higgins, Jessica Jackson, and Leah Thomas..

== Dream Corps TECH ==
Dream Corps TECH started as #YesWeCode in early 2015 alongside Rebuild the Dream. The organization works to teach low-income kids how to code.
