= Rashad Robinson =

American civil rights leader (born 1979)

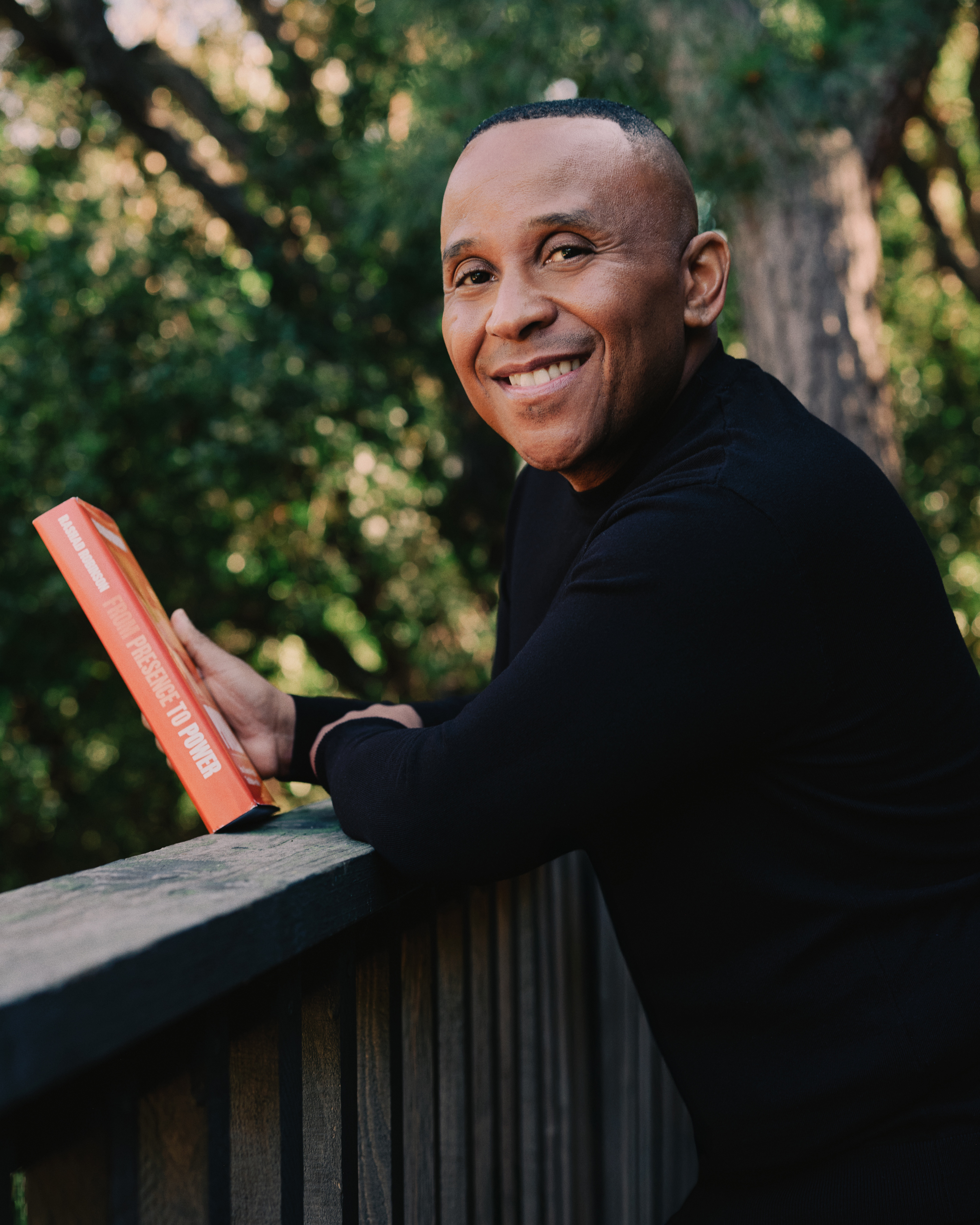
- Robinson in 2026
- Born: 1979 (age 46–47)
- Education: Marymount University (BA)
- Occupations: Author, Civil rights leader
- Organization(s): GLAAD, Right to Vote, FairVote, Color of Change
- Movement: Civil rights

Rashad Robinson is an American civil rights leader. He was the president of Color of Change until 2024. He has served as a board member of RaceForward, Demos, and State Voices. He is currently on the Committee for the First Amendment (CFA)’s steering committee.

== Career ==
After graduating from Marymount University, Robinson held leadership roles at GLAAD, the Right to Vote Campaign, and FairVote.

While at GLAAD, Robinson served as Senior Director of Media Programs, leading the organization's advocacy and major media campaigns. He led dozens of campaigns pursuing criminal justice, voting rights, racial equity, gay rights and economic reform.

=== Color of Change (2011 - 2024) ===
In 2011, Rashad Robinson became the president of Color of Change, an advocacy organization founded after Hurricane Katrina with the purpose of assisting black communities in America.

During Robinson's tenure as president, Color Of Change expanded to four offices in New York, Washington, D.C., Los Angeles, and Oakland, California.

Robinson organized many of the organization's initiatives, including a campaign to pull funding from the American Legislative Exchange Council and the Black Tech Agenda, which works to create racial justice tech policies and prevent algorithm discrimination. Color Of Change helped protect the principle of net neutrality by pushing the FCC to reclassify broadband as a common carrier service. The organization's Winning Justice campaign pushed prosecutors to reduce incarceration, end the use of money bail, and change sentencing schemes under which hundreds of thousands of Black people are imprisoned in the US. The group has also persuaded businesses, including Mastercard and PayPal, to stop accepting payments from white nationalist groups, to refrain from sitting on President Trump's Business Council. Color Of Change is credited with working with Silicon Valley companies, including Airbnb, Google and Facebook, to improve diversity inside their companies and address policies that harm Black users.

In 2017, Robinson was a member of the inaugural cohort of Atlantic Fellows for Racial Equity.

In 2020, Robinson launched the advertiser boycott of Meta Platforms and worked on police reform campaigns that resulted in assisting 8 million people. That June, Lady Gaga gave him access to her Instagram account in order to discuss racial justice, in honor of Juneteenth.

In September 2024, the National Labor Relations Board ruled that Color Of Change violated federal labor law.

Robinson transitioned from Color of Change in December 2024.

=== 2024 to present ===
In late 2024, he formed Rashad Robinson Advisors and set up a “Narrative Power” hub, which provides strategies and resources for creating cultural content.

In 2025, Robinson began hosting the “Freedom Table”, a monthly NewsOne series that discusses democracy protection and Black communities.

Robinson was formerly on the board of the Marguerite Casey Foundation as well as the Aspen Institute’s Commission on Information Disorder. He is currently co-chair for the Committee for the First Amendment (CFA)’s steering committee.

His book, From Presence to Power: How to Take On the Fights That Matter and Win, was published and released by Random House Publishing Group in July 2026. The book examines the distinction between surface-level attention in an incentive-driven society and the deeper, structural power to actually change society's rules, using the lens of progressive politics in the United States as its central case. It has been listed as a USA Today bestseller.

== Media appearances and recognition ==
From 2010 to 2014, Robinson was selected as one of "The Root 100," a list of emerging and influential African Americans under the age of 45.

Robinson regularly appears in the media, including NPR, MSNBC, CNN, PBS, and BET. He has a monthly column in the US edition of The Guardian. His editorials have been published by The New York Times, Huffington Post, The Washington Post, and USA Today.

In March 2015, Ebony magazine called Robinson one of several "breakthrough leaders who have stepped up and are moving forward in the perpetual fight for justice." In May 2015, Huffington Post included Robinson in a series highlighting "some of the people and issues that will shape the world in the next decade." The same month, Robinson received an honorary doctoral degree from St. Mary's College of Maryland.

On September 25, 2020, Robinson was named as one of the 25 members of the "Real Facebook Oversight Board", an independent monitoring group over Facebook.

== Personal life ==
Robinson grew up in Riverhead, Long Island, and graduated from Riverhead High School in 1997. At high school he led a protest against a local convenience store that barred students from entering during their lunch break. He also became involved with the NAACP while in high school.

Robinson attended Marymount University where he obtained a bachelor's degree in political science. In 2022, he received an honorary doctorate from Georgetown University as part of the graduating class of 2020.

Robinson, who is openly gay, lives in New York City.
