= Jeff Chang (journalist) =

American journalist

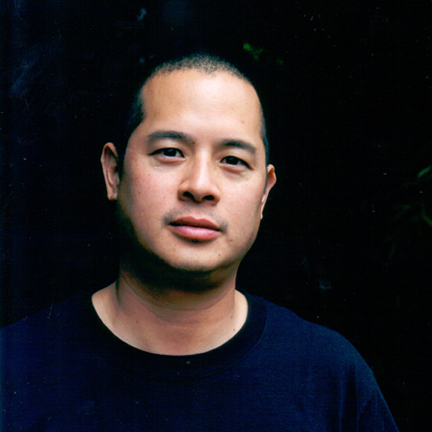
- Born: Honolulu, Hawaii, U.S.
- Education: University of California, Berkeley (BA); University of California, Los Angeles (MA)
- Awards: American Book Award
- Website: jeffchang.net

Jeff Chang is an American journalist and music critic on hip hop music and culture. His 2005 book, Can't Stop Won't Stop, which won the American Book Award, chronicles the early hip hop scene. His writing has appeared in URB, BOMB, San Francisco Chronicle, The Village Voice, San Francisco Bay Guardian, Vibe, Spin, The Nation, and Mother Jones. He has also been featured on NPR.

Chang was the executive director of the Institute for Diversity in the Arts + Committee on Black Performing Arts at Stanford University. He also served as the executive director of the Institute for Diversity in the Arts at Stanford. In June 2018, the Institute announced that Chang would leave to become the first vice president of Narrative, Arts, and Culture at Race Forward.

== Early life and education ==
Chang was born and raised in Honolulu, Hawaii, and is of Taiwanese ancestry. After attending ʻIolani School, he graduated from the University of California, Berkeley, and earned a master's degree in Asian American studies from the University of California, Los Angeles.

== Career ==
In 1993, Chang co-founded and ran the indie hip hop label SoleSides, which is now known as Quannum Projects. He helped launch the careers of DJ Shadow, Blackalicious, Lyrics Born, and Lateef the Truthspeaker.

As a student, Chang was influenced by the anti-apartheid and the anti-racist movements at University of California, Berkeley, where he worked as a community laborer and student organizer. He also worked as a lobbyist for the students of the California State University. Chang has lectured at colleges, universities, festivals, and institutions in the U.S. and around the world. Chang was an organizer of the inaugural National Hip-Hop Political Convention.

Chang is a United States Artists Fellow in Literature, and has won awards such as the North Star News Prize award, the UTNE Reader award, the St. Clair Drake Teaching Award at Stanford University in 2014 and the 50 Visionaries Changing Your Word award. He cofounded CultureStrike and ColorLines movements. In 2005 he participated in a conversation with Tom Hayden, the social and political activist and director of the Peace and Justice Resource Center in Culver City, California, in the Mario Savio Memorial Lecture.

In 2007, Chang interviewed then-candidate Barack Obama, for the cover of Vibe magazine. He has also written for The Nation, The New York Times, the San Francisco Chronicle, The Believer, Foreign Policy, n+1, Mother Jones, Salon, Slate, and BuzzFeed, among others.

In 2005, Picador published his first book, Can't Stop Won't Stop, which won the American Book Award and the Asian American Literary Award. In 2007, he edited the book Total Chaos: The Art and Aesthetics of Hip-Hop, a compilation of different artists' interviews and discussions.

In 2020, Chang was involved in a documentary called Asian Americans on PBS. Chang served as a featured commentator, bringing his expertise in cultural history and social issues to the forefront. His contributions primarily revolved around providing historical context and cultural analysis, particularly focusing on the intersection of race, identity, and the Asian American experience. With his background in exploring similar themes through the lens of hip-hop culture, Chang offered unique insights into the narrative of Asian Americans.

Chang resides in the San Francisco Bay Area.

== Bibliography ==
=== Books ===
- Can't Stop Won't Stop (2005)
- Who We Be: A Cultural History of Race in Post-Civil Rights America (2014, St. Martin's Press)
- We Gon' Be Alright: Notes on Race and Resegregation (2016, Picador)

=== Edited works ===
- Total Chaos: The Art and Aesthetics of Hip-Hop (2007)
