= Can't Stop Won't Stop (book) =

Book by Jeff Chang

Can't Stop Won't Stop: A History of the Hip-Hop Generation
- Author: Jeff Chang
- Language: English
- Subject: Hip hop
- Genre: Non-fiction
- Publisher: Picador
- Publication date: 2005
- Publication place: United States
- Pages: 560 pp
- ISBN: 0-312-42579-1
- OCLC: 62860625

Can't Stop Won't Stop: A History of the Hip-Hop Generation is a 2005 book by Jeff Chang chronicling the early hip-hop scene.

The book features portraits of DJ Kool Herc, Afrika Bambaataa, Chuck D, and Ice Cube, among others, and is based on numerous interviews with graffiti artists, gang members, DJs, rappers, and hip-hop activists. DJ Kool Herc wrote the introduction.

== Reception ==
The book was well received, winning an American Book Award in 2005. Scott T. Sterling of LA Weekly praised the book as being "extensively researched and meticulously written" and The New Yorker described it as "one of the most urgent and passionate histories of popular music ever written".

Conversely, some reviewers were more critical of Can't Stop Won't Stop. Alex Abramovich of The New York Times argued that the book focused too heavily on politics over music, leading it to "lose its form and focus" at points. Ben Thompson of The Independent opined that the book focused excessively on topics like "the internal politics of US hip-hop magazine The Source" while giving insufficient attention to rappers like the Notorious B.I.G., Missy Elliott, or Eminem.

=== KRS-One's response ===
In 2007, KRS-One criticized Can't Stop Won't Stop: "When I read Can't Stop Won't Stop I didn't see the scholarship. I saw Kool Herc thrown at the front of the book for his own credibility—and the foreword was wack." His main point of contention was with the way he himself was covered: "[Jeff Chang] gets around to the Stop The Violence movement and totally downplays the movement, destroys any kind of hope we have for leadership in our culture, and just breezes over with inaccurate information about the Stop The Violence movement."

Jeff Chang responded: "Can't Stop Won't Stop was and is never meant to be the last word on anything. It's meant to be a small contribution to the larger wave of thinking about the hip-hop generation."

== Notes ==
- Chang, Jeff (2005). Can't Stop Won't Stop: A History of the Hip-Hop Generation. Picador, ISBN 0-312-42579-1.
