= James Rucker =

American activist

- Occupations: Co-Founder, Color of Change
- Website: www.colorofchange.org

James Rucker is the co-founder of Color of Change, an online activist organization that aims to strengthen the political voice of African Americans in the United States. The organization was founded by Rucker and Van Jones in the wake of Hurricane Katrina, and helped to raise awareness for the cause of the Jena Six.
