= War Times: Reports from the Opposition =

War Times: Reports From The Opposition

Studio album by Van Jones and Mumia Abu-Jamal
- Released: 2003
- Genre: Political
- Producer: Van Jones

War Times: Reports From The Opposition is a 2003 album financed by, produced by, and featuring the voice of Van Jones. It had a radical anti-war theme and it was hosted by the controversial cultural icon Mumia Abu-Jamal, of whom Van Jones had been a political supporter. Audio excerpts were played on the Glenn Beck program.

The end of the occupation. The right of return of the Palestinian people. These are critical dividing lines in human rights. We have to be here. No American would put up with an Israeli-style occupation of their hometown for 53 days let alone 54 years. US tax dollars are funding violence against people of color inside the US borders and outside the US borders.

— Van Jones
