= Color of Change =

US nonprofit civil rights organization

- Founded: 2005
- Founder: James Rucker, Van Jones
- Type: 501(c)(4)
- Purpose: Civil rights, politics, mass media
- Location: Oakland, California
- Method: Online advocacy, lobbying, petitions
- Key people: Rashad Robinson, Heather McGhee
- Revenue: $6.12 million (2024)
- Website: colorofchange.org

Color of Change is a progressive nonprofit civil rights advocacy organization in the United States. It was formed in 2005 in the aftermath of Hurricane Katrina in order to use online resources to strengthen the political voice of African Americans. Color of Change is a 501(c)(4) advocacy organization with an affiliated political action committee.

== History and overview ==
Color of Change was co-founded in 2005 by James Rucker and Van Jones to replicate the MoveOn.org email list model among African American Internet users. Rucker had previously worked for the MoveOn.org Political Action and MoveOn.org Civic Action while Jones was the founder of the Ella Baker Center for Human Rights. Rashad Robinson is the organization's president, having joined the organization in May 2011.

Color of Change utilizes the Internet, and specifically e-mail, as its main conduit for communicating with its members. Web 2.0 developments such as social networking sites also contribute to the organization's strategy.

In 2015, Color of Change was ranked 6th on Fast Company's list of the 50 Most Innovative Companies in the World.

Rashad Robinson serves as the organization's president. In December 2019 Heather McGhee became chair of the board of directors.

== Activities ==
=== Criminal justice advocacy ===
The organization gained prominence with its national campaign to assist the Jena Six, in which Color of Change raised $212,000 for the Jena Six legal defense, largely through online donations. The Chicago Tribune's Howard Witt noted that Color of Change was the only national civil rights group to be fully transparent with their use of the funds related to the Jena Six. The Jena campaign was such a galvanizing force that it tripled Color of Change's membership.

In September 2008, Color of Change began a campaign in support of Troy Davis. Over 666,000 petitions urging clemency for Mr. Davis were delivered to the Georgia pardons board. The Georgia Board of Pardons and Paroles denied clemency to Troy Davis. Color of Change released a formal statement after Troy Davis' death.

Color of Change began a campaign in support of Trayvon Martin on March 19, 2012. The organization also advocated the repeal of Stand Your Ground laws nationwide.

In 2013, Color of Change launched a campaign targeting private prisons, demanding that investors in private prisons divest their investments. Various corporations have since divested nearly $60 million from the private prison industry.

=== Criticism of media ===
Glenn Beck

In 2009, Color of Change launched a campaign urging advertisers on Glenn Beck's Fox News show to pull their ads, in response to comments by Beck in which he called President Obama "a racist" who has a "deep-seated hatred for white people or the white culture." Affected advertisers switched their ads to different Fox programs.

Nas and Fox News

A campaign against Fox News was developed in protest of recurring remarks that Color of Change believed to be racist, including negative comments directed at President Barack Obama and First Lady Michelle Obama. This campaign was led by hip hop artist Nas, Color of Change, Moveon.org, and Brave New Films. The campaign collected 620,000 petition signatures, which were delivered to Fox News headquarters in July 2008.

Pat Buchanan

In 2011, Color of Change launched a campaign urging MSNBC to fire Pat Buchanan for his alleged remarks about white supremacy and his affiliation with a white supremacist radio program. MSNBC suspended Buchanan's show for four months before cancelling it in February 2012.

News Accuracy Report Card

In March 2015, Color of Change and Media Matters for America released Not To Be Trusted: Dangerous Levels of Inaccuracy in TV Crime Reporting in NYC, a report detailing how the organization believes that local news coverage in New York City distorts the picture of criminal justice, and the negative impacts this inaccurate imagery has on black communities.

All My Babies' Mamas

In January 2013, Color of Change launched a campaign demanding that Oxygen and its parent company, NBCUniversal, cease production on the reality TV show All My Babies’ Mamas, starring rapper Shawty Lo and the ten mothers of his eleven children. Color of Change argued that the show perpetrated harmful stereotypes about African American families. A Change.org petition garnered over 40,000 signatures and Oxygen announced the cancellation of the show.

Saturday Night Live

In October 2013, an open letter penned by Color of Change Executive Director Rashad Robinson and published in The Hollywood Reporter criticized Saturday Night Live (SNL) Executive Producer Lorne Michaels for the lack of diversity on SNL, pointing out that only three black women had joined the show’s repertory cast in its then-39-year history.

Othniel Askew

In October 2014, Color of Change listed Othniel Askew among other victims of police violence published on Twitter. Askew was shot by a police officer in 2003 moments after he assassinated the New York City council member James Davis while he still had seven bullets in his gun. Several of the witnesses of the event were outraged by the inclusion of Askew in the list as a “victim” of police brutality since he was shot at by an officer while Askew was armed with a gun and murdering Davis on a public balcony with said gun.

Amy Pascal

In December 2014, Color of Change launched a petition for Sony to fire Amy Pascal, the co-chairman of Sony Pictures Entertainment, after her e-mails were leaked. Pascal had suggested President Barack Obama would enjoy Django Unchained and The Butler, two films which deal with slavery in the United States and the pre-civil rights era.

#ChangeHollywood

In 2020, Color of Change partnered with Michael B. Jordan to launch the #ChangeHollywood initiative, which outlines strategies for increasing representation in the entertainment industry. The initiative provides recommendations for investing in diverse storytelling, supporting Black creatives, and reallocating resources within the industry.

== Policy positions ==
In 2012, representatives from the Color of Change attended a meeting of the Democracy Initiative, a progressive coalition whose goals include restricting political contributions permitted by the United States Supreme Court decision in Citizens United v. Federal Election Commission and combating voter ID laws.

In July 2014, Color of Change launched a campaign calling out ten members of the Congressional Black Caucus for opposing efforts to protect net neutrality.

Color of Change advocated for investigations of Wall Street banks in the wake of a national housing and foreclosure crisis.

== Political advocacy ==
=== American Legislative Exchange Council ===
Color of Change began a boycott campaign against the American Legislative Exchange Council (ALEC) on December 8, 2011, objecting to ALEC's support of Voter ID laws. After the campaign was expanded to a protest of stand-your-ground laws following the Trayvon Martin shooting, a number of major companies pulled their funding from ALEC. Color of Change also urged its members to take online and offline action to convince corporations to quit ALEC.

=== Congressional Black Caucus ===
The organization lobbied the Congressional Black Caucus (CBC) in 2007 to not host a Democratic presidential debate with the Fox network. Democratic presidential candidates Hillary Clinton and Barack Obama eventually decided to shun the Congressional Black Caucus/Fox debate. James Rucker, one of the founders of Color of Change, argued that Fox was using its partnership with the CBC as part of an image building campaign to make itself appear more "Black-friendly."

In 2008, Color of Change began an e-mail campaign to urge members of the CBC (those who are superdelegates) to endorse candidates according to how their districts voted. In February 2008, Representative John Lewis, a senior member in Congress and the CBC, declared that he would switch his allegiance from Hillary Clinton to Barack Obama because his district overwhelmingly supported Obama in its primary.

=== Support for net neutrality ===
In 2019, Color of Change joined several other organizations calling for support for net neutrality by asking for pressure to be put on Senator Mitch McConnell to stop blocking the Save the Internet Act in the U.S. Senate.

=== Opposition to use of plantations for weddings ===
In late 2019, after contact initiated by Color of Change, "five major websites often used for wedding planning have pledged to cut back on promoting and romanticizing weddings at former slave plantations."

== See also ==
- Media Matters for America
- Fairness and Accuracy in Reporting
- People for the American Way
- Darnell Hunt
