= BREATHE Act =

Proposed United States law

The BREATHE Act is a proposal for a federal omnibus bill, presented by the Electoral Justice Project of the Movement for Black Lives. The bill proposes to divest taxpayer dollars from policing and invest in alternate, community-based approaches to public safety.

Champions of the bill include Ayanna Pressley, Democratic Representative of Massachusetts's 7th congressional district and Rashida Tlaib, Democratic Representative of Michigan's 13th congressional district. Tlaib said in a virtual unveiling of the BREATHE Act with the Movement for Black Lives that "Our communities in the 13th and I are committed to fully engaging with this legislation seriously and with a sense of urgency."

== Background ==
The drafting of the legislation was preceded by killings of Black Americans by white police officers in 2020, including George Floyd and Breonna Taylor, as well as others from across the early 20th century, including Tony McDade, Natasha McKenna, Aiyana Stanley-Jones, Elijah McClain, Pearlie Golden, Kayla Moore, Freddie Gray, Atatiana Jefferson, and Oscar Grant. The bill was unveiled on July 7, 2020, as protests and uprisings against police brutality were happening throughout the country.

The Electoral Justice Project, a project of the Movement for Black Lives, drafted the BREATHE Act in response to police killings of black people in the United States. The bill is named after the phrase, "I can't breathe", a Black Lives Matter slogan associated with a number of African Americans who said the phrase, sometimes repeatedly, before dying at the hands of police officers. Although the first known victim to say the phrase was Eric Garner in 2014, following the murder of George Floyd, protestors have more commonly associated the phrase with Floyd.

Organizers of the BREATHE Act capitalized on the momentum from the summer 2020 protests and a discernible shift in public opinion to push for policy change at the level of the federal government. "We crafted this bill to be big," Gina Clayton Johnson, one of its creators and the executive director of Essie Justice Group, said during a live-streamed announcement event, "because we know the solution has to be as big as the 400-year-old problem itself."

== Political context ==
After a number of highly publicized killings of Black Americans at the hands of police officers, most notably the murder of George Floyd and the shooting of Breonna Taylor, a series of protests began to spread around the country. In response to these protests, and the Movement for Black Lives (M4BL) called for a series of coordinated Juneteenth actions. On July 6, just after Independence Day and on the heels of weeks of sustained protest, M4BL unveiled The BREATHE Act as a legislative intervention based on its Vision for Black Lives.

In July 2020, in advance of the Democratic National Convention, Patrisse Cullors, co-founder of Black Lives Matter, spoke at the Democratic National Committee's virtual party platform meeting. Cullors called out the party for rejecting platform amendments that included criminal justice, policing, and legal system reforms. She called on the Democrats to support the BREATHE Act, saying "without the sea changes our movement recommended for the 2020 Democratic platform, any claims to allyship and solidarity with our work to fight for Black liberation are for naught." Later in August, during the Democratic National Convention, famous actors including Jane Fonda and Kendrick Sampson, released a video reading the rejected amendments and called for them to be added to the DNC platform.

On August 28, 2020, the Movement for Black Lives hosted the first virtual Black National Convention which aimed to set forth "a vision for Black Lives before the biggest election of our time, and long after." The convention, a callback to the 1962 National Black Political Convention, presented a multi-hour virtual broadcast hosted by Pose star Angelica Ross. It featured activists such as Tarana Burke and Brittany Packnett Cunningham. During the convention, the BREATHE Act was presented as a policy solution to meet the moment addressing issues like police brutality, climate disaster, and reparations.

== Provisions ==
The BREATHE Act is an omnibus bill that addresses police brutality and racial injustice by advocating for numerous reforms. The legislation is divided into 4 sections, which call for the following:

- Section 1: Divesting federal resources from incarceration and policing and ending criminal legal system harms
- Section 2: Investing in new approaches to community safety utilizing funding incentives
- Section 3: Allocating new money to build healthy, sustainable and equitable communities for all people
- Section 4: Holding political leaders accountable and enhancing self-determination of Black communities

The bill, in part, would "divest" federal resources from incarceration and policing, institute changes to pretrial detention, sentencing and prosecution, and also reduce the Department of Defense budget. It would establish a neighborhood demilitarization program that would collect and destroy military-grade equipment, such as armored vehicles, held by law enforcement agencies.

The bill also would end life sentences, abolish mandatory minimum sentencing laws and create a specific timeline to close federal prisons and immigration detention centers. Some of the proposals in the bill, such as the plan to abolish ICE, piggyback on similar calls dating back to 2018.

The BREATHE Act's most notable diversion from past reform efforts is its explicit demand that Congress repeal the 1994 Violent Crime Control and Law Enforcement Act, colloquially known as the "crime bill". For example, the BREATHE Act would repeal the "three-strikes law", which, when it passed in 1994, was seen as a rule that would deter repeat criminal activity. It would also prohibit the use of the modern taser, which was developed in the 1990s by a private company and subsequently marketed as a way to prevent police killings as an alternative to firearms. The bill's supporters argue that these practices and policies have been harmful and dangerous.
