= Green for All =

- Formation: 2007
- Founders: Van Jones; Majora Carter
- Type: Environmental advocacy program
- Parent organization: Dream.Org
- Website: dream.org/green-for-all/

Green for All is an American environmental advocacy program of Dream.Org, formerly known as Dream Corps. The program focuses on lobbying for clean energy, pollution reduction, and employment opportunities in the green economy.

Green for All was founded in 2007 by Van Jones and Majora Carter as an independent nonprofit organization. Following a merger with Dream Corps Unlimited after 2014, Green for All continued as an environmental advocacy program of the combined organization, which adopted the name Dream Corps. Dream Corps subsequently became known as Dream.Org.

== History ==
At its launch in 2007, Green for All advocated public investment in training workers for jobs in renewable energy and energy efficiency, emphasizing employment opportunities for low-income communities and workers without college degrees.

In July 2012, the San Francisco Public Utilities Commission (SFPUC) awarded Green for All a $200,000 contract to develop a jobs strategy for its energy-efficiency program. Juliet Ellis, an SFPUC assistant general manager who also served as Green for All's paid chair, participated in discussions concerning the contract. The contract was subsequently rescinded, and Green for All returned the $91,000 it had received.

In January 2020, Green for All, along with other environmental organizations, groups and individuals, urged a Boston-area transit agency to transition into electric buses and commit to only deploying electric buses by 2030.

In November 2020, Green for All received a $10 million grant from the Bezos Earth Fund. In August 2023, The Daily Beast reported that former Dream.Org employees questioned the management of the grant, citing rapid staff expansion and concerns about the program's strategic direction.
