= Ella Baker Center for Human Rights =

American non-profit organization

- Formation: 1996; 30 years ago
- Headquarters: Oakland, California, USA
- Co-Founder: Van Jones, esq.
- Exec. Dir.: Marlene Sanchez
- Website: ellabakercenter.org

The Ella Baker Center for Human Rights is a non-profit strategy and action center based in Oakland, California. The stated aim of the center is to work for justice, opportunity and peace in urban America. It is named for Ella Baker, a twentieth-century activist and civil rights leader originally from Virginia and North Carolina.

Ella Baker Center works primarily through four initiatives to break cycles of urban violence and reinvest in urban centers. The organization calls for an end to recent decades of disinvestment in cities, excessive and sometimes racist policing, and over-incarceration in order to stop violence and hopelessness in poor urban communities and communities of color. The Ella Baker Center supports better schools, cleaner environment, and more opportunities for young people and working people.

== History ==
=== 1995–1997 ===
The Ella Baker Center for Human Rights developed as an offshoot from Bay Area PoliceWatch, a 1995 project by the Lawyers' Committee for Civil Rights. PoliceWatch was founded in 1995 as a hotline for victims of police brutality, lawyer referral, and compilation of a database on officers named in complaints. The hotline was based in a closet-sized office donated by the Lawyers' Committee for Civil Rights. The need for assistance was great, so Bay Area PoliceWatch quickly outgrew the space.

Van Jones officially launched the Ella Baker Center for Human Rights on September 1, 1996. Named for one of the lesser-known civil rights leaders, the Ella Baker Center said of itself, "This is not your parents' civil rights organization." The group was known for a passion and willingness to take on tough fights that few other organizations would tackle. It said its mission was "to document, challenge and expose human rights abuses" in the criminal justice system."

The Ella Baker Center for Human Rights' first large campaign was for Aaron Williams, an unarmed black man killed in 1995 in a street confrontation with several San Francisco police officers. Officer Marc Andaya was accused of taking part in beating and kicking Williams, emptying three cans of pepper spray into his face, and restraining him in an unventilated police van where he died. Andaya had a record for past misconduct, including involvement in the death of another unarmed black man, 37 formal complaints of racism and brutality, and five lawsuits filed against him, much of this when he worked for the Oakland Police Department and prior to his hiring by San Francisco. Bay Area PoliceWatch helped lead a community-based campaign, "Justice for Aaron Williams", that put Andaya on public trial. After an investigation and long disagreement, the Police Commission fired Andaya from the San Francisco Police Department.

Van Jones, the Executive Director, said, "This case became a question of not letting the authorities get away with this level of wholesale disrespect and disregard for human life and for the rule of law. Community witnesses, several dozen of them, all said that after Aaron was down on the ground and handcuffed, the policeman was kicking him in the head with cowboy boots, and that he was identifiable because he was the only officer in plainclothes."

=== 1997–2000 ===
The Aaron Williams victory began a period of growth for the Ella Baker Center. New campaigns and organizing projects included youth group Third Eye Movement, New York City PoliceWatch, a transgender activist collective TransAction in connection with Community United Against Violence, and INSWatch, an initiative with La Raza Centro Legal.

Third Eye Movement spent its first few years working on local issues, including the police murder of Sheila Detoy.

Then Proposition 21, an initiative that would increase a variety of criminal penalties for crimes committed by youth and prosecute many youth offenders within the adult criminal justice system, reached the California ballot. Third Eye Movement worked together with a coalition of youth organizations in the Bay Area to oppose Proposition 21. Third Eye Movement became a national example of a new generation of hip hop activism. Hip Hop News and the FNV Newsletter said in December 2000, "Third Eye Movement was one of the leading Hip Hop organizations here in the Bay that helped led [sic] the fight against California's infamous Prop 21 [Juvenile Crime Bill]. They had made a mark for themselves by using Hip Hop as a tool to help bring about social change. Over the past couple of years, it has not been unusual to see these cats show with as many as 500 people and shut down a business or spark up a rally. People are still talking how earlier this year, the group came through with close to 300 people and surrounded the Hilton Hotel in downtown San Francisco and shut it down. The owner of the Hotel chain had apparently contributed a bunch of money in support of Prop 21." Due in part to this movement, Bay Area counties were the only ones in the state to reject Proposition 21 in March 2000, but it passed statewide, part of a national wave of increasing penalties for crimes that has contributed to over-incarceration in the United States.

=== 2000–2003 ===
When Proposition 21 was passed in the rest of California, the youth movement went through a period of "despair, mistrust, and infighting". Third Eye Movement split and the Oakland chapter developed a new Ella Baker Center campaign, 'Let's Get Free'. 'Let's Get Free' focused on police accountability in Oakland. Other members of the Ella Baker Center launched a new campaign, Books Not Bars.

Books Not Bars and its ally, Youth Force Coalition, focused on derailing the proposed construction of one of the nation's largest new juvenile halls in Oakland's Alameda County. Alameda County agreed to cut the proposed expansion by 75 percent and to relocate the hall much closer to the families whose children were going to be incarcerated.

This campaign marked the growth of Ella Baker Center from protest tactics to a combination of protest and policy agenda and gave the group experience in managing the complex coalition fighting the jail expansion. The video produced by the Ella Baker Center after this success was highly acclaimed at festivals such as the Human Rights Watch Film Festival 2006.

=== 2004–present ===
After protesting the juvenile hall expansion, the Ella Baker Center focused on campaigning proactively for its vision of the juvenile justice system. In early 2004, a series of reports by The Mercury News substantiated Ella Baker Center's claim that the California Youth Authority, now the California Division of Juvenile Justice, operated in a way that was abusive and ineffective. Books Not Bars campaigned to change the whole system of warehouse-like prisons, arguing to reduce the youth population and quickly get youths back to their communities.

Between 2004 and 2006, the youth prison population was lowered by more than 50 percent. The Ella Baker Center built a statewide network of over 500 member families with children in the Youth Authority. #Books Not Bars' vision for reform now focuses on a rehabilitation-based model similar to Missouri's system. As the Ella Baker Center built a focus on opportunity-creation through community job, wealth and health creation, the #Green-Collar Jobs Campaign – bringing jobs in the green economy to Oakland – launched. The campaign once known as Let's Get Free became Silence the Violence, a youth-led campaign based on the idea that increased opportunity for young people can bring peace to Oakland streets, not more policing or incarceration. The campaign launched with a "Summer of Non-Violence" and a compilation hip hop CD dealing with issues of neighborhood violence, aiming to create a culture of peace. Silence the Violence has since transitioned into #Heal the Streets, a youth fellowship program focusing on policy advocacy. #Soul of the City – a program to bring Oakland residents together to address their deepest concerns and build their highest hopes through learning, service and leadership – launched on the day of President Obama's inauguration in January 2009.

== Campaigns ==
The Ella Baker Center works toward its goal of "justice in the system, opportunity in our cities and peace on our streets" through four campaigns which promote alternatives to violence and incarceration: Books Not Bars, Soul of the City, Green-Collar Jobs Campaign, and Heal the Streets.

=== Books Not Bars ===
Books Not Bars works to close California’s current youth prison system and replace it with effective, rehabilitative alternatives and community-based centers.

Books Not Bars targets California's youth prisons, which are frequently described as "draconian lockup units" under the authority of the California Division of Juvenile Justice, or DJJ. The campaign focuses on the fact that inside the DJJ, formerly known as the California Youth Authority (CYA), young people are subjected to unusually harsh conditions, as instances of 23-hour-a-day solitary confinement for months at a time, lock-ups in small cages during class time and denial of basic medical care are common. At least five young people have died since 2004 in these prisons.

Books Not Bars criticizes the DJJ not only as an abusive system, but also an ineffective one. The existing system costs California $160,000 a year for every young person behind bars. Even so, the rate of recidivism is 75%. By these standards, California has the nation's most expensive, least effective juvenile justice system.

Books Not Bars uses a number of different tactics to achieve its goals. It works to:

- Advocate for policy reforms that place young people in appropriate rehabilitation programs instead of youth prisons.
- Educate the public with rallies and events, media work, a website, and documentary screenings.
- Organize parents and families of incarcerated youth through local chapters of "Families for Books Not Bars", the state's only network of families with incarcerated children.
- Unite prosecutors, judges, business leaders and teachers calling for reform.

In 2008, Books Not Bars celebrated success as two youth prisons, El Paso de Robles and Dewitt Nelson Youth Correctional Facilities, were officially closed. In the same year, Books Not Bars helped get the Family Communications Act signed into law. This act is a huge step toward better communication between youth behind bars and their families.

=== Soul of the City ===
Soul of the City is an initiatitve by Ella Baker Center endeavor. It is a "hands-on, hands-together" campaign to create a community that is safe, healthy, and balanced. The program is working to transform Oakland into a socially just, spiritually connected, ecologically sustainable city with shared prosperity for all. Soul of the City brings residents together to address community concerns and build on hopes through learning, service, and leadership.

The staff and volunteers of Soul of the City:

- Provide political education. "Reclaim the Future" workshops teach interconnectedness and connect with shared purpose to transform the city.
- Lead community service and community solutions programs. Soul of the City believes that solutions are found neighborhood by neighborhood. The project's "Serve Our City" community service projects are member-led initiatives that bring people together to share resources, build mutual prosperity, and improve the environment. Serve Our City projects emphasize interconnectedness, healing, and hope.
- Offer new leadership. Soul of the City attempts to engage residents in the political process to shape policy and programs that lift up all communities. Soul of the City aims to create an invested voter base that transforms the capacity of all neighborhoods to achieve sustainability and prosperity.

=== Green-Collar Jobs Campaign ===
The Green-Collar Jobs Campaign addresses the lack of meaningful work opportunities for at-risk youth and the formerly incarcerated. The campaign catalyzes workforce opportunities in the burgeoning green economy, creating dignified jobs for low-income families. It is working to "build a green economy that is strong enough to lift people out of poverty" through policy advocacy, public outreach, and an employment pipeline called the Oakland Green Jobs Corps.

Ella Baker Center unveiled this campaign, first known as "Reclaim the Future" at the United Nations World Environmental Day Conference in 2005. Carla Perez, an organizer at fellow Bay Area non-profit Communities for a Better Environment, states, "Ella Baker Center really opened up the door for the whole local environmental justice movement to come together and reach a wider audience through this event." As billions go into eco-friendly construction, clean technology, urban agriculture and renewable energy, Green-Collar Jobs Campaign works to ensure that low-income people will be able to take part in these new opportunities.

The initiative works to increase investment into the “green” economy, creating jobs for low-income families, at risk youths and formerly incarcerated persons.

The Green-Collar Jobs Campaign works to:

- Recruit participants and provide them with ongoing support.
- Teach participants “soft” skills: general life skills necessary to be successful in any work environment.
- Teach participants "hard" skills: specific required to work on new energy projects as a member of the Oakland Green Corps.
- Provide participants with employment experience for a limited time on City-funded renewable energy and efficiency projects.
- Support participants in transitioning from the Oakland Green Jobs Corps into independent employment.

In 2008, the Oakland City Council voted to financially support the Oakland Green Jobs Corps in the amount of $250,000. This money will provide "a vital pool of seed funding" to attract matching donations over the long-term. A portion of these funds will create special paid internships for Green Jobs Corps graduates in renewable energy and energy efficiency.

=== Heal the Streets ===
Heal the Streets is a new ten-month fellowship program that trains Oakland teens (ages 15 – 18) to develop and advocate for policies that bring peace and hope to their city's streets.

The Heal the Streets Fellowship program aims to:

- Give fellows experience working on the front lines of public policy reform.
- Help fellows gain research and leadership skills.
- Engage fellows in organizing community events and collaborating with major community organizations.

In 2009, the first year of the fellowship, Heal the Streets fellows identified teen joblessness as a major contributor to violence in their community and made policy recommendations on the issue to local city and school board officials.

== See also ==
- List of human rights organisations
