= Rebuild the Dream =

American center-left political organization

Rebuild the Dream is an American center-left political organization founded in June 2011 by former Obama administration advisor Van Jones and the group MoveOn.org. It aims to counter the Tea Party movement.

== Principles ==
The group's central principles are outlined in the "Contract for the American Dream".

1. Invest in America's infrastructure.
2. Create 21st century energy jobs.
3. Invest in public education.
4. Offer Medicare for all.
5. Make work pay.
6. Secure Social Security.
7. Return to fairer tax rates.
8. End the wars and invest at home.
9. Tax Wall Street speculation.
10. Strengthen democracy.

== Membership ==
Jones said on July 31, 2011, that the group had 127,000 members.
