= The Green Collar Economy =

2008 book by Van Jones

- Author: Van Jones
- Subject: Sustainable development, sustainable business, environmental movement in the United States, environmental justice, Green New Deal
- Publication date: 2008
- Publication place: United States
- ISBN: 978-0-06-165075-8
- OCLC: 289095894
- Dewey Decimal: 363.7
- LC Class: GE180.J66 2008

The Green Collar Economy: How One Solution Can Fix Our Two Biggest Problems is a 2008 book by Van Jones. It outlines a plan for simultaneously solving socioeconomic inequality and environmental problems. The book has received favorable reviews from Al Gore, Nancy Pelosi, Laurie David, Paul Hawken, Winona LaDuke and Ben Jealous. The Green Collar Economy is the first environmental book written by an African-American to make the New York Times bestseller list.

The book is a detailed proposal for a "green new deal". Jones describes the opportunity to create thousands of low- and medium-skill jobs that help conserve energy (for example, insulating older homes and buildings) or use alternate energy sources (solar panels). He emphasizes that these would be local jobs that could not be exported. With appropriate incentives and programs, the jobs could be created in inner cities and thereby help lift people out of poverty. According to Jones, Americans can ensure the "approaching green wave lifts all boats," and calls for a mass movement to tackle the United States' ecological and economic crises.
