= Van Jones =

American political analyst and civil rights activist (born 1968)

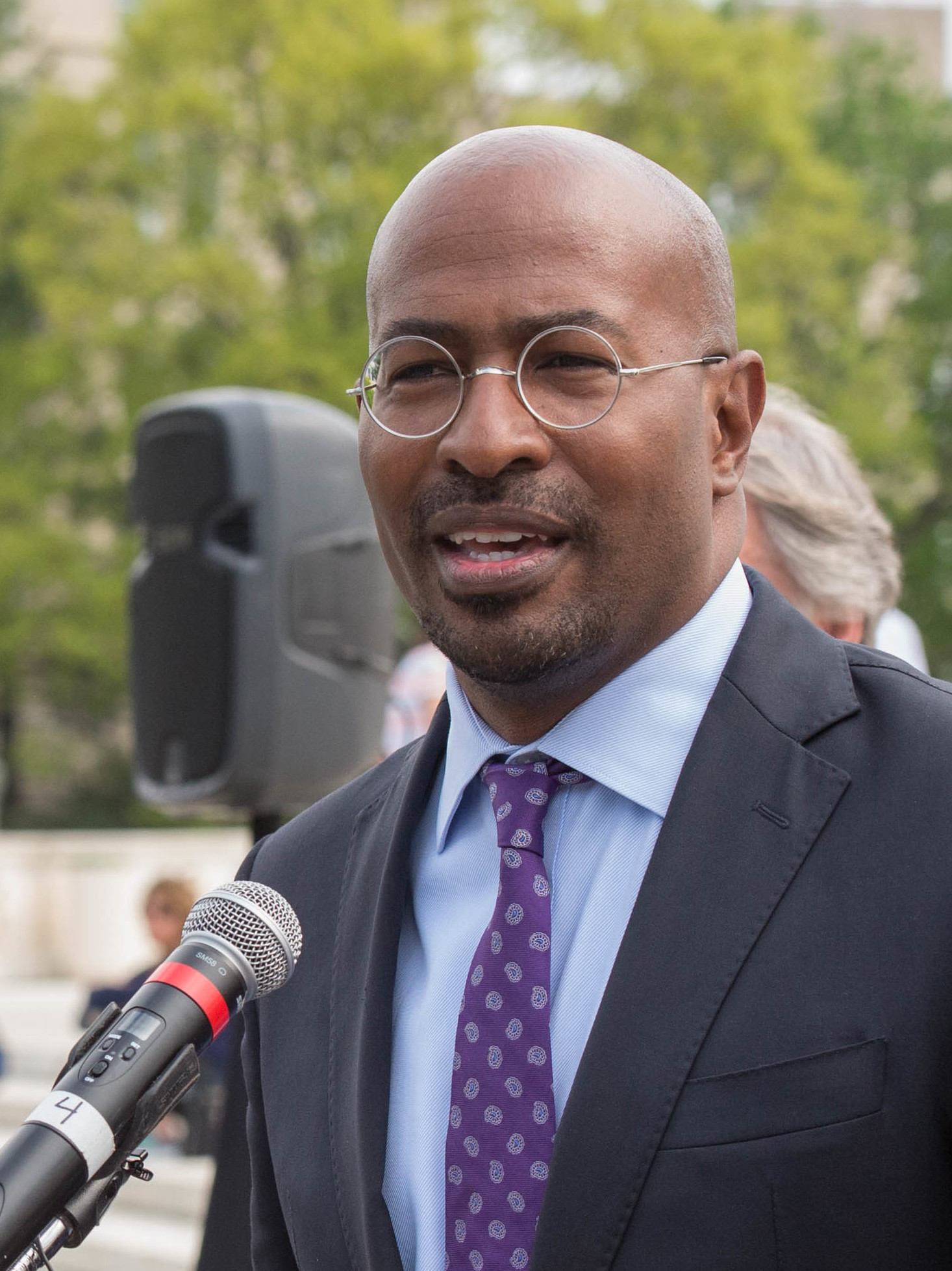
- Jones in 2016
- Born: Anthony Kapel Jones; September 20, 1968 (age 58); Jackson, Tennessee, U.S.
- Education: University of Tennessee at Martin (BS); Yale University (JD)
- Occupations: News commentator; author; lawyer
- Political party: Democratic
- Spouse: Jana Carter (m. 2005; div. 2019)
- Website: vanjones.net

Anthony Kapel "Van" Jones (born September 20, 1968) is an American political commentator, activist and author.

Jones published his first book, The Green Collar Economy, in 2008. He was President Barack Obama's Special Advisor for Green Jobs in 2009 and was appointed as a distinguished visiting fellow at Princeton University in 2010. He founded or co-founded several non-profit organizations, including the Ella Baker Center for Human Rights, Color of Change, the Dream Machine Innovation Labs, and the Dream.Org (formerly known as The Dream Corps).

Jones has hosted or co-hosted CNN shows including Crossfire, The Messy Truth, The Van Jones Show and The Redemption Project with Van Jones. He is the author of The Green Collar Economy and a regular CNN political commentator.

== Early life and education ==
Anthony Kapel Jones and his twin sister Angela were born in Jackson, Tennessee, on September 20, 1968, to high school teacher Loretta Jean (née Kirkendoll) and middle school principal Willie Anthony Jones. His sister said that as a child, he was "the stereotypical geek—he just kind of lived up in his head a lot." Jones has said as a child he was "bookish and bizarre." His grandfather was a leader in the Christian Methodist Episcopal Church, and Jones sometimes accompanied him to religious conferences. He would sit all day listening to the adults "in these hot, sweaty black churches."

Jones graduated from Jackson Central-Merry High School, a public high school in his hometown, in 1986. He earned his Bachelor of Science in communication and political science from the University of Tennessee at Martin (UT Martin). During this period, Jones also worked as an intern at The Jackson Sun (Tennessee), the Shreveport Times (Louisiana), and the Associated Press (Nashville bureau). He adopted the nickname "Van" when he was 17 and working at The Jackson Sun. At UT Martin, Jones helped to launch and lead a number of independent, campus-based publications. They included the Fourteenth Circle (University of Tennessee), the Periscope (Vanderbilt University), the New Alliance Project (statewide in Tennessee), and the Third Eye (Nashville's African-American community). Jones later credited UT Martin for preparing him for a larger life.

Deciding against journalism, Jones moved to Connecticut to attend Yale Law School. In 1992, in the aftermath of the Rodney King beating and trial, he was among several law students selected by the Lawyers Committee for Human Rights, based in San Francisco, to serve as legal observers to the protests triggered by the verdict. King had been beaten by police officers in an incident caught on camera. Three of the officers were acquitted and the jury deadlocked on the verdict of the fourth officer. Jones and others were arrested during the protests, but the district attorney later dropped the charges against Jones. The arrested protesters, including Jones, won a small legal settlement. Jones later said that "the incident deepened my disaffection with the system and accelerated my political radicalization". Jones was deeply affected by the trial and verdict. In an October 2005 interview, Jones said he had been "a rowdy nationalist on April 28th" before the King verdict was announced, but that by August 1992 he had become a communist.

Jones's activism was also spurred by seeing the deep racial inequality in New Haven, Connecticut, particularly in prosecution of drug use. Jones has said, "I was seeing kids at Yale do drugs and talk about it openly, and have nothing happen to them or, if anything, get sent to rehab ... And then I was seeing kids three blocks away, in the housing projects, doing the same drugs, in smaller amounts, go to prison." After graduating from law school with his Juris Doctor in 1993, Jones moved to San Francisco, and according to his own words, "trying to be a revolutionary". He became affiliated with many left activists, and co-founded a socialist collective called Standing Together to Organize a Revolutionary Movement (STORM). It protested against police brutality, held study groups on Marxism, Leninism, and Maoism, and aspired to establish multi-racial socialism.

== Career ==
=== Early career ===
Jones was affiliated with the Lawyers' Committee for Civil Rights, which had brought him to the city as a legal observer in 1992. In 1995, Jones initiated their project of Bay Area PoliceWatch, the region's only bar-certified hotline and lawyer-referral service for victims of police abuse. The hotline started receiving fifteen calls a day.

Jones described the development of the project:

"We designed a computer database, the first of its kind in the country, that allows us to track problem officers, problem precincts, problem practices, so at the click of a mouse we can now identify trouble spots and troublemakers", said Jones. "This has given us a tremendous advantage in trying to understand the scope and scale of the problem. Now, obviously, just because somebody calls and says, 'Officer so-and-so did something to me,' doesn't mean it actually happened, but if you get two, four, six phone calls about the same officer, then you begin to see a pattern. It gives you a chance to try and take affirmative steps.

=== Non-profit organizations ===
==== Ella Baker Center for Human Rights ====
By 1996, Jones founded a new umbrella NGO, the Ella Baker Center for Human Rights. He operated out of "a closet-like office" within the space of Eva Paterson, executive director of the Lawyers' Committee, and used his personal computer.

In 1996–1997, Jones and PoliceWatch led a campaign to gain the firing of officer Marc Andaya from the San Francisco Police Department. Andaya was accused of excessive force in the in-custody death in 1995 of Aaron Williams, an unarmed black man who fought on the street with several officers. There was community outrage about his death and pressure on the department to bring justice against Andaya, who witnesses saw kick Williams in the head. In the year after the incident, the press reported that Andaya had a record of incidents of misconduct in the 1980s. The San Francisco Chronicle reported in addition that Andaya was named in 10 complaints between 1983 and 1993, eight of them allegedly for misuse of physical force, when he was a policeman with the Oakland Police Department. Investigation revealed more brutality complaints in Oakland and two lawsuits against him; the San Francisco Police Commission voted to fire Andaya in June 1997 for falsifying his application to the department.

In 1999 and 2000, Jones led a campaign to defeat Proposition 21, which would increase "penalties for a variety of violent crimes and required more juvenile offenders to be tried as adults." He worked to mobilize a student protest movement against the proposition; this effort made national headlines, but it ultimately imploded. He began to work for more solidarity and building broader alliances across politics and class to achieve goals.

The proposition was passed by voters, part of a nationwide wave of states' increasing punishments for crimes. This has led to increasingly high rates of incarceration in the United States, especially of minorities. In 2001, Jones and the Ella Baker Center launched the "Books Not Bars" campaign. From 2001 to 2003, he led an effort to block the construction of a proposed "Super-Jail for Youth" in Oakland's Alameda County. Books Not Bars later launched a statewide campaign to transform California's juvenile justice system.

During the 2003 California gubernatorial recall election, Jones served as Arianna Huffington's statewide grassroots director.

==== Color of Change ====
Following Hurricane Katrina in 2005, Jones and James Rucker co-founded a Web-based grassroots organization to address Black issues, called Color of Change. Color of Change's mission, as described on its website, is as follows: "ColorOfChange.org exists to strengthen Black America's political voice. Our goal is to empower our members—Black Americans and our allies—to make government more responsive to the concerns of Black Americans and to bring about positive political and social change for everyone."

==== Green For All and environmental work ====
By 2005, Jones had begun promoting eco-capitalism and environmental justice. In 2005 the Ella Baker Center expanded its vision beyond the immediate concerns of policing, declaring that "If we really wanted to help our communities escape the cycle of incarceration, we had to start focusing on job, wealth and health creation." In 2005, Jones and the Ella Baker Center produced the "Social Equity Track" for the United Nations' World Environment Day celebration, held that year in San Francisco.

The Green-Collar Jobs Campaign was Jones's first effort to combine his goals of improving racial and economic equality with mitigating environmental damage. He worked to establish the nation's first "Green Jobs Corps" in Oakland. On October 20, 2008, the City of Oakland formally launched the Oakland Green Jobs Corps, a public-private partnership to "provide local Oakland residents with job training, support, and work experience so that they can independently pursue careers in the new energy economy."

==== The Green Collar Economy ====
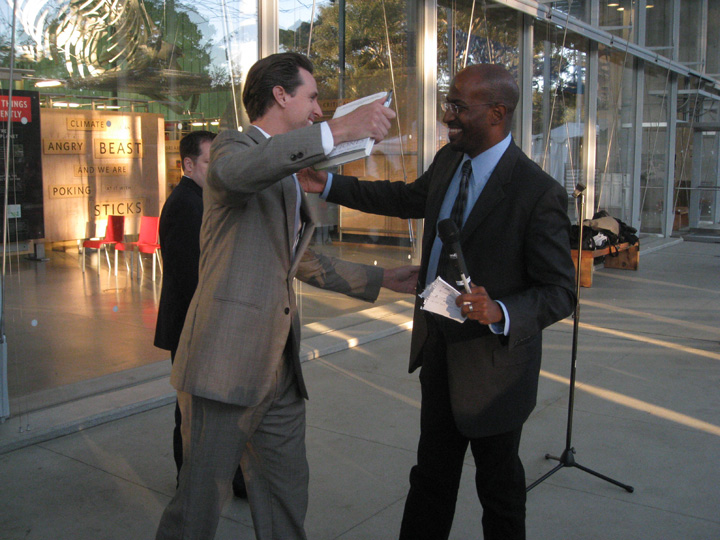
Jones meets with then-mayor of San Francisco Gavin Newsom at a book signing for The Green Collar Economy, October 14, 2008.

Jones published his first book, The Green Collar Economy, in 2008. He describes his "viable plan for solving the two biggest issues facing the country today—the economy and the environment." The book received favorable reviews from Al Gore, Nancy Pelosi, Tom Daschle, Carl Pope, and Arianna Huffington.

In the book, Jones contended that invention and investment was needed to transition from a pollution-based "grey economy" and into a healthy new "green economy". Jones wrote:

We are entering an era during which our very survival will demand invention and innovation on a scale never before seen in the history of human civilization. Only the business community has the requisite skills, experience, and capital to meet that need. On that score, neither government nor the nonprofit and voluntary sectors can compete, not even remotely. So in the end, our success and survival as a species are largely and directly tied to the new eco-entrepreneurs—and the success and survival of their enterprises. Since almost all of the needed eco-technologies are likely to come from the private sector, civic leaders and voters should do all that can be done to help green business leaders succeed. That means, in large part, electing leaders who will pass bills to aid them. We cannot realistically proceed without a strong alliance between the best of the business world—and everyone else.

Jones had a limited publicity budget and no national media platform. But a viral, web-based marketing strategy earned the book a #12 debut on the New York Times bestseller list. Jones and Green For All used "a combination of emails and phone calls to friends, bloggers, and a network of activists" to reach millions of people. Due to the marketing campaign's grassroots nature, Jones said that achieving bestseller status was a victory for the entire green-collar jobs movement. In August 2008 Jones was featured on the grassroots radio program Sea Change Radio.

==== Rebuild the Dream ====
In June 2011, Jones worked with MoveOn.org to launch the Rebuild the Dream campaign, which was intended to start a progressive American Dream movement to counter the Tea Party movement. Following a kickoff on June 23, 2011, Rebuild the Dream announced a "Contract for the American Dream" and held house meetings in July. It was intended "to give the progressive mass movement that rose up to elect Barack Obama a new banner to march under". The launch included performances by The Roots and a DJ set by artist Shepard Fairey. In August 2012, Prince announced a series of concerts in Chicago to support Rebuild the Dream. Jones claimed 127,000 people had become involved in the movement by the end of July 2011.

In April 2012, Jones published his second book, titled Rebuild the Dream. It debuted at number 16 on the New York Times Best-Seller list.

==== Dream.Org ====
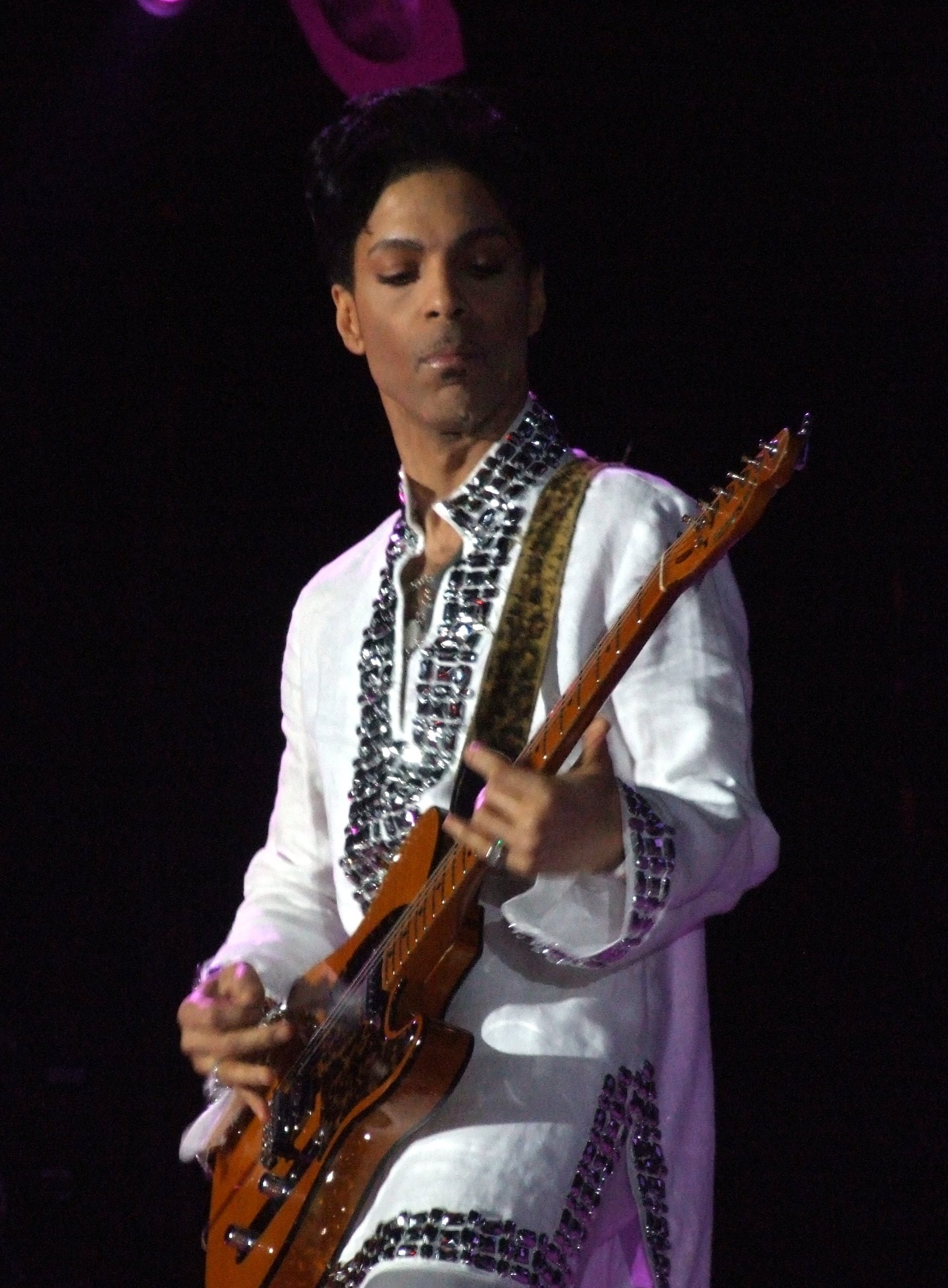
Jones was a longtime friend and associate of American musician Prince. Jones often cites Prince as the reason he wears a purple tie during TV appearances.

Jones is President of Dream.Org, a "social enterprise and incubator for powerful ideas and innovations designed to uplift and empower the most vulnerable in our society".

===== #YesWeCode =====
In early 2015, Jones launched #YesWeCode, an initiative aiming to "teach 100,000 low-income kids to write code". The musician Prince appeared at the Essence Festival to help support the launch. Jones credits his longtime friend Prince with the idea to form #YesWeCode. #YesWeCode has hosted several hackathons, including one in Detroit in partnership with MSNBC, and Oakland. In an interview on CNN on April 21, 2016, hours after the musician Prince's death, Jones revealed that Prince had secretly contributed to the funding of #YesWeCode. Jones also revealed that the musician had been a major philanthropist who preferred to give anonymously to a wide spectrum of charitable causes. Prince used Jones and others as surrogates to distribute his gifts. As a Jehovah's Witness, Prince did not want to receive public credit for his charitable work. Jones was among the 20 people who gathered for a private memorial service at Paisley Park after Prince's death.

===== #cut50 =====
In 2015, Jones launched #cut50, an organization focused on bi-partisan solutions to criminal justice reform issues. The name referred to the group's goal of reducing the total US incarcerated population by 50% over a ten-year period. In March 2015 #cut50 hosted a "bi-partisan summit" with Republican Newt Gingrich, former Speaker of the House, to promote bi-partisan solutions.

In November 2015, #cut50 gained the support of singer Alicia Keys. In 2016, Keys made a video appeal to Congressman Paul Ryan asking him to "be her Valentine" and commit to giving legislation on criminal justice reform a vote. Ryan made this commitment days later. #cut50 received additional celebrity support from "100 A-List celebrities" including Amy Schumer, Steph Curry, Edward Norton, Jesse Williams, Chris Pine, Russell Simmons, Shonda Rhimes, Russell Brand, Jessica Chastain, and Piper Kerman.

In May 2018, Jones and other members of #cut50 met with Jared Kushner and President Donald Trump at the White House to discuss a criminal justice reform bill.

==== The First Step Act ====
Working with the Trump White House and Kim Kardashian, Jones and #cut50 were involved in helping to pass the First Step Act, a criminal justice reform bill The New York Times called "the most substantial changes in a generation" to national crime and sentencing laws. A 2024 review by the Brennan Center for Justice found that more than 44,000 people had been released under the law and over 4,000 had received reduced sentences, and that the recidivism rate among participants was about 10 percent.

==== Advocates for Opioid Recovery ====
Jones founded Advocates for Opioid Recovery together with former House Speaker Newt Gingrich and former Rep. Patrick J. Kennedy.

Jones has served on the boards of numerous environmental and nonprofit organizations, including Natural Resources Defense Council (NRDC), 1Sky, the National Apollo Alliance, Social Venture Network, Rainforest Action Network, Bioneers, Julia Butterfly Hill's "Circle of Life" organization, and Free Press. He currently serves on the board of trustees at Demos.

==== REFORM Alliance ====
In 2019, Jones was announced as the CEO of REFORM Alliance, an initiative founded by Jay-Z, Meek Mill, New England Patriots owner Robert Kraft, among others. The initiative aims to reform the criminal justice system and has received funding from Twitter CEO Jack Dorsey.

=== Business ventures and initiatives ===
==== Magic Labs Media ====
Magic Labs Media is a media company founded and owned by Jones. The company co-produced two documentaries directed by Brandon Kramer: City of Trees (2015), about a green-jobs program in Washington, D.C., and The First Step (2021), which followed Jones’ push for bipartisan criminal justice reform and premiered at the Tribeca Film Festival. Additionally, in 2016, it produced The Messy Truth miniseries, which won a Webby Award, and in 2020 it produced The Messy Truth VR experience, which won an Emmy Award. In 2021, the weekly podcast "Uncommon Ground with Van Jones" began. Jones also hosted The Messy Truth with Van Jones, an interview series for the Be Woke.Vote voter-registration campaign co-founded by filmmaker Deon Taylor. Its guests included Jamie Foxx and Busta Rhymes.

==== Dream Machine Innovation Lab ====
In 2024, Jones founded the Dream Machine Innovation Lab initiative aimed to bring artificial intelligence skills and tools to Black and Latino communities. Under the banner "Make Wakanda Real", he urged people in those communities to use AI as a tool for creativity and economic opportunity. That June, the lab held a free one-day AI training session in Atlanta for students, professionals, and small-business owners. Amazon and Microsoft were among the companies that took part.

In 2025, the initiative expanded its educational spectrum through the AI x Library Project, a series of artificial intelligence workshops and training programs hosted across public libraries in cities including Brooklyn and Atlanta, in partnership with Google.

==== Rapport ====
Jones also co-founded Rapport, a workplace technology company that uses artificial intelligence to support employee engagement and workplace communication.

=== Obama White House ===
==== Special Advisor for Green Jobs ====
In March 2009, Jones was appointed as Special Advisor for Green Jobs, Enterprise and Innovation at the White House Council on Environmental Quality. Jones, while an ardent supporter of President Barack Obama, had not planned on working for his administration. Jones later said, "when they asked the question, I burst out laughing because at the time it seemed completely ludicrous that it would even be an option. I think what changed my mind was interacting with the administration during the transition process and during the whole process of getting the recovery package pulled together."

Columnist Chadwick Matlin described Jones as serving as "switchboard operator for Obama's grand vision of the American economy; connecting the phone lines between all the federal agencies invested in a green economy." Jones did not like the informal "czar" term sometimes applied to his job. He described his role as "the green-jobs handyman. I'm there to serve. I'm there to help as a leader in the field of green jobs, which is a new field. I'm happy to come and serve and be helpful, but there's no such thing as a green-jobs 'czar.'"

Jones's appointment was criticized by conservative media such as WorldNetDaily and Fox News commentator Glenn Beck, who mentioned Jones on fourteen episodes of his show. They criticized Jones for his radical political activities in the 1990s, including participation in STORM and his public support for Mumia Abu-Jamal, a prisoner convicted and sentenced to death, in a highly controversial trial, for murdering a police officer.

In July 2009, Color of Change, which Jones had founded but left, launched a campaign urging advertisers on Beck's Fox News show to pull their ads, in protest of Beck's saying that President Obama had a "deep-seated hatred for white people or the white culture". In September 2009, a video on YouTube was circulated of a February 2009 lecture by Jones at the Berkeley Energy and Resources Collaborative. He used strong language to refer to Congressional Republican lawmakers, and himself, when conveying that Democrats need to step up the fight. The incident made headlines and Jones apologized, saying his words "do not reflect the views of this administration, which has made every effort to work in a bipartisan fashion, and they do not reflect the experience I have had since I joined the administration."

==== Resignation ====
Representative Mike Pence (R-Indiana), the chairman of the Republican Conference in the U.S. House of Representatives and future vice-president, and Senator John Cornyn (R-Texas), Chairman of the National Republican Senatorial Committee, publicly criticized Jones for his remarks. Senator Kit Bond (R-Missouri) urged Congress to investigate Jones's "fitness" for the position. Bob Beckel, a Fox News political analyst who was formerly an official in the Carter administration, was the first prominent Democrat to call for Jones's resignation. Jones was also criticized for allegedly having signed a 2004 petition by 911Truth.org that suggested the Bush administration "may indeed have deliberately allowed 9/11 to happen". Jones immediately said he did not agree with the statement and had not signed the petition. While the issue was open, the allegations were grounds for more tumult: conservative columnist Charles Krauthammer said that, while other accusations against Jones were "trivial", this was "beyond partisanship". Jones issued a statement that said, "In recent days some in the news media have reported on past statements I made before I joined the administration – some of which were made years ago. If I have offended anyone with statements I made in the past, I apologize. As for the petition that was circulated today, I do not agree with this statement and it certainly does not reflect my views now or ever." (Finally, on July 27, 2010, the group 911truth.org released a statement confirming that they had "researched the situation and were unable to produce electronic or written evidence that Van agreed to sign the Statement".)

Jones resigned on September 5, 2009, saying he had been the subject of a "vicious smear campaign" by "opponents of reform [of health care and clean energy]" who were "using lies and distortions to distract and divide." He felt he was becoming a distraction to the administration's achieving its goals. During an interview on ABC's This Week, White House Press Secretary Robert Gibbs thanked Jones "for his service to the country", while noting that the president did not endorse his past comments nor his support for Abu-Jamal.

Some liberal commentators expressed continued support for Jones. Arianna Huffington predicted Beck's efforts would backfire by freeing Jones to be more outspoken. John McWhorter in The New Republic criticized Obama for having Jones resign.

=== Academic and policy roles ===
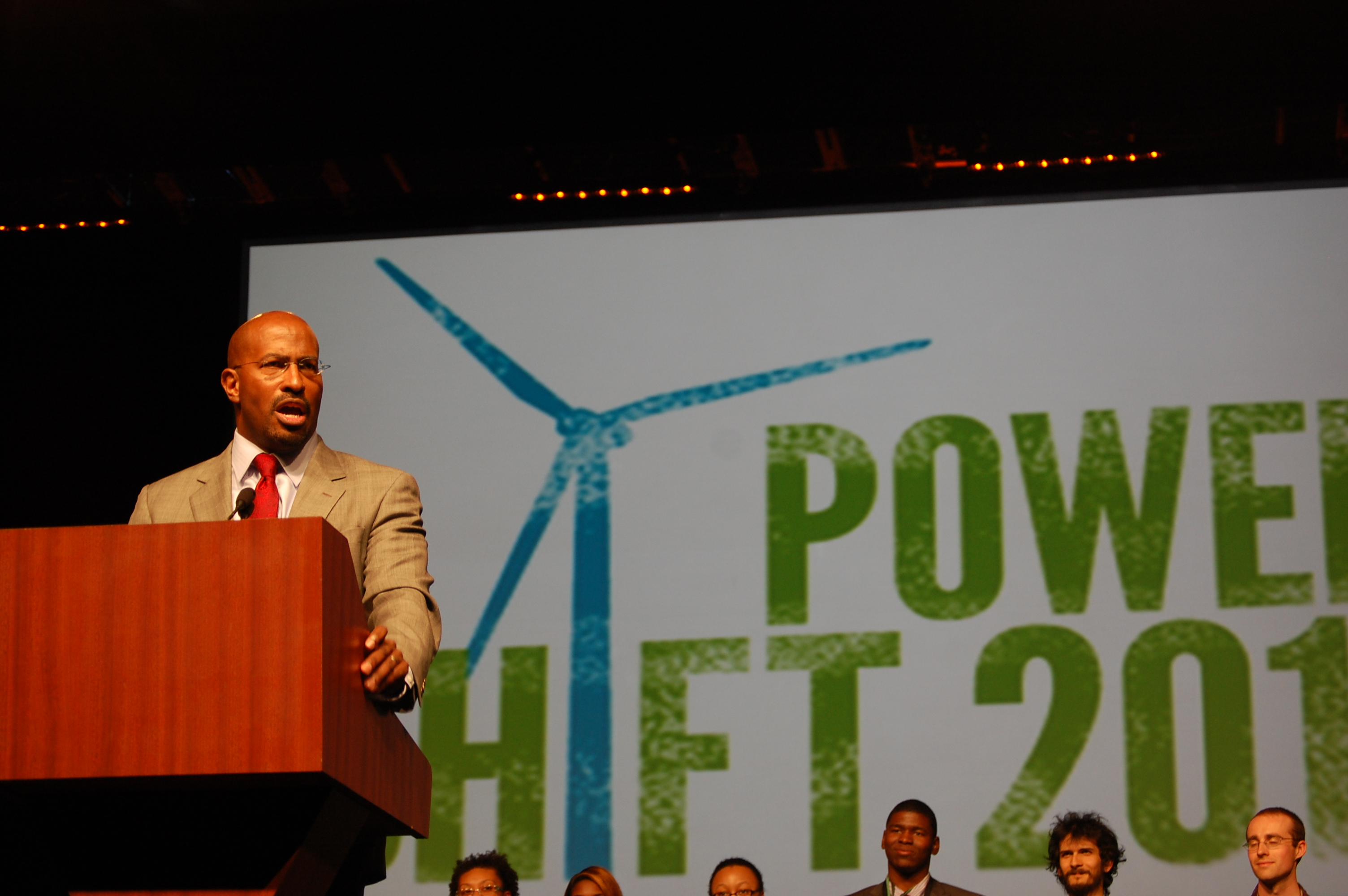
Jones speaking at Power Shift 2011, an annual youth summit, in Washington, D.C., on April 15, 2011

==== Center for American Progress ====
In February 2010, Jones became a senior fellow at the Center for American Progress. He led their Green Opportunity Initiative "to develop a clearly articulated agenda for expanding investment, innovation, and opportunity through clean energy and environmental restoration".

==== Princeton ====
Around the same time, Jones received appointments at Princeton University, as a distinguished visiting fellow in both the Center for African American Studies and in the Program in Science, Technology and Environmental Policy at the Princeton School of Public and International Affairs. He was also a Director's Fellow at the MIT Media Lab.

Jones continued to advocate for green jobs after leaving the Obama administration. On October 2, 2010, Jones spoke at the One Nation Working Together rally in Washington, D.C. He addressed linking the fight against poverty with the fight against pollution, saying that green jobs would bring "real solutions" instead of "hateful rhetoric". On April 15, 2011, Jones was a keynote speaker at Powershift 2011 in Washington, D.C. He previously served as a keynote speaker for Powershift 2009.

=== Media career ===
==== CNN ====
===== Television shows =====
In June 2013, Jones was announced as a co-host of a re-boot of the CNN political debate show Crossfire, alongside Newt Gingrich, Stephanie Cutter and S.E. Cupp. The new version of Crossfire made its debut on September 16, 2013, but the show had been canceled by October 2014.

In 2016, Jones launched The Messy Truth, a news feature documentary series and subsequent studio discussion series, The Messy Truth with Van Jones, which aired in 2017 on CNN. In 2018, Jones launched The Van Jones Show on CNN, with Jay-Z as his first guest.

In 2019 Jones launched The Redemption Project with Van Jones, a show focused on restorative justice and bringing "offenders face to face with the people most affected by their violent crimes."

===== Commentary =====
Jones continued after the end of Crossfire as a regular CNN contributor. He has contributed to segments on a wide range of topics, including Obama administration policies, Supreme Court decisions, protests in Ferguson, Missouri, after the fatal shooting by police of an unarmed young black man, and the 2016 Republican presidential primary. After the November 2016 election victory by Republican Donald Trump, Jones described the result as a "whitelash": his term for a racist backlash by white Americans who had opposed President Obama. In December 2016, Jones was accused of having a conflict of interest for running a PR firm called Megaphone Strategies, which openly lobbies electoral college electors not to cast their vote for Donald Trump.

On October 18, 2019, Hillary Clinton suggested Russians are "grooming" Tulsi Gabbard to be a third-party candidate who would help President Trump win reelection through the spoiler effect. Jones defended Gabbard, stating that "I do not want someone of her [Clinton's] stature to legitimate these attacks against anybody. If you’ve got real evidence, come forward with it. But if you’re just going to smear people casually on podcasts, you are playing right into the Russians' hands."

On May 29, 2020, while on CNN's New Day, Jones commented, "It's not the racist white person who is in the Ku Klux Klan that we have to worry about. It's the white liberal Hillary Clinton supporter walking her dog in Central Park who would tell you right now, you know, people like that – 'oh, I don't see race, race is no big deal to me, I see us all as the same, I give to charities. But the minute she sees a black man who she does not respect or who she has a slight thought against, she weaponized race like she had been trained by the Aryan Nation.", referring to the incident involving Christian Cooper being falsely accused of threatening the life of the unrelated Amy Cooper. He went on to say "even the most liberal, well-intentioned white person has a virus in his or her brain that can be activated at an instant."

In late spring 2020, after the police murder of George Floyd and subsequent worldwide Black Lives Matter rallies, protests and marches, Jones advised the Trump White House on police reform policy. In several subsequent media appearances, he praised the president's executive order on police reform. A few weeks later, Jones was called out by The Daily Beast for not revealing his behind-the-scenes White House policy consulting work as he touted the policy in his other role as CNN political news pundit.

In October 2025, Jones was criticized for joking about images of dead children in Gaza and describing their appearance in social media as disinformation serving Iranian and Qatari interests during an appearance on Real Time with Bill Maher. Jones apologized after social media backlash, writing that "The suffering of the people of Gaza — especially the children — is not a punch line." Among the critics of his comment was Maryland Democratic Senator Chris Van Hollen. That month, Drop Site News reported that Jones is a mentor for the Karsh Journalism Fellowship, a journalism fellowship founded by activist Jacki Karsh and her husband Jeff with a stated goal of helping Israel win an "information war".

=== Support for Nicole Daedone ===
In 2026, Jones signed a letter requesting leniency for OneTaste founder Nicole Daedone before her sentencing. Daedone was convicted for participation in a forced labor conspiracy in which she ordered multiple victims to perform uncompensated labor ranging from sex work with investors to menial domestic work. Several journalists have compared OneTaste to a cult and pyramid scheme.

In his letter, Jones said Daedone has "dedicated her life to helping others find healing, empowerment and a deeper sense of human connection." Daedone ultimately received a sentence of nine years imprisonment.

== Awards and honors ==
Jones's awards and honors include:

- 1996 – Brick Award Now renamed as Dosomething Awards
- 1998 – Reebok Human Rights Award
- 2000 – Ashoka Fellow
- 2008 – Time magazine, Environmental Hero
- 2008 – Puffin/Nation Prize for Creative Citizenship
- 2009 – Hubert H. Humphrey Civil Rights Award
- 2009 – Individual Thought Leadership, Energy & Environment Awards; Aspen Institute
- 2010 – NAACP President's Award
- 2010 – Commonwealth Club of California – Inforum's 21st Century Visionary Award
- 2010 – Global Exchange Human Rights Award Honoree.
- 2013 – Ebony Magazine's Power 100, "The Innovators"
- 2015 – Environmental Media Association's Green Biz Global Innovator Award
- 2015 – Rainbow Push Coalition's 2015 Vanguard Award
- 2017 – Webby Awards, Special Achievement award for his "use of the Internet and social media during the 2016 election"
- 2019 – Lumiere Award from the Advanced Imaging Society for Magic Labs' "The Messy Truth VR Experience", a virtual reality documentary
- 2020 – Emmy Award for Outstanding Original Interactive Program
- 2021 – Recipient of inaugural Courage and Civility Award from Jeff Bezos at press conference following Blue Origin's first human flight (includes US$100 million to distribute to non-profit organizations of Jones' choice)

== Selected publications ==
=== Books ===
- Jones, Van; Conrad, Ariane (2008). The Green Collar Economy. New York: HarperOne. ISBN 978-0-06-165075-8.
- Jones, Van (2012). Rebuild the Dream. New York: Nation Books. ISBN 978-1-56858-714-1.
- Jones, Van (2017). Beyond the Messy Truth: How We Came Apart, How We Come Together. Ballantine Books. ISBN 978-0399180026.

== See also ==
- Al Gore – Vice President of the United States from 1993 to 2001
- Efficient energy use – Methods for higher energy efficiency
- Green economy – Economy based on ecological economics
- Green-collar worker – Environmental-sector worker
- List of people from Tennessee
- List of U.S. executive branch czars – High-level officials who oversee a particular policy
- List of Yale Law School alumni
- Renewable energy commercialization – Deployment of technologies harnessing easily replenished natural resources
- Renewable energy in the United States
- Social justice – Concept in political philosophy
- War Times: Reports from the Opposition
