= ColorLines =

Colorlines
- Editor: Charlene Sinclair
- Former editors: Toccara Castleman Akiba Soloman Aura Bogado Kai Wright
- Categories: Race and Politics
- Frequency: Daily
- Publisher: Race Forward
- Founded: 1998
- Country: United States
- Language: English
- Website: www.colorlines.com
- ISSN: 1098-3503

Colorlines is a digital news platform that publishes political content focusing on social justice and progressive activism.

== History ==
Colorlines was founded in 1998 as a print publication published jointly by the Applied Research Center (now Race Forward), and the now defunct Center for Third World Organizing, a training center for community organizers of color. Founded by Bob Wing and Jeff Chang, Colorlines worked to popularize a race-centered cultural and political analysis and bring attention to contemporary race justice issues and movements in the United States.

In 2010, Colorlines became an exclusively digital publication featuring investigative reporting and news analysis from the perspective of communities of color. For over a decade, Colorlines published award-winning journalism and articles that ranged from essays, investigative reports, think pieces, opinion columns, and cultural criticism. The publication's shift to digital publishing resulted in national recognition and an annual readership of over 20 million.

Under the leadership of Dr. Charlene Sinclair, Chief of Staff at Race Forward, Colorlines restructured in the fall of 2022 to meet the demands of the political landscape and grew into a digital multimedia platform. It relaunched in January 2023.

== Notable Impact and Awards ==
In 2011, Race Forward and Colorlines launched a pledge campaign to drop the usage of the word “illegal” in reference to undocumented immigrants. On November 15, 2011, Drop the I-Word called on the Associated Press to remove “Illegal Immigrant” from Stylebook. In April 2013, the Associated Press announced the change via a Blog post. The New York Times and USA Today also announced the consideration of discontinuing its use. The L.A. Times followed suit on May 1, 2013.

In November 2011, Race Forward and Colorlines published the “Shattered Families” report after a yearlong investigative reporting by Colorlines. The investigation discovered that more than 5,000 children were stuck in foster care because their parents were detained by ICE. One in four deportees have U.S.-born kids and face a total loss of parental rights.

The report, along with a series of investigative articles, received an exclusive on ABC's Nightline, revealing the truth that parents were being separated from their US citizen children due to deportation.

In May 2012, Colorlines journalist, Seth Freed, received the 2012 Hillman Prize for Web Journalism. The journalism prize is awarded annually to journalists, writers, and public figures who pursue social justice and public policy for the common good. This award was for the Shattered Families yearlong investigation on kids lost in the U.S. Deportation system.

In 2015, Colorlines and Race Forward published Race Reporting Guide, providing critical language and story framing to reflect ethical and rigorous journalistic standards that affirm the dignity and human rights of people of all races.

== About the Publisher ==
Race Forward publishes Colorlines. Race Forward (formerly known as ARC - Applied Research Center) was founded in 1981 to bring systemic analysis and an innovative approach to complex race issues to help people take effective action toward racial equity. Gary Delgado founded the Applied Research Center (ARC) as "the racial justice movement’s national home for media, research and activism" and an analytic resource for community organizations of color in the Center for Third World Organizing (CTWO) network. ARC published Colorlines, a quarterly print magazine, starting in 1998.

ARC was rebranded as Race Forward in November 2013. Race Forward merged with the Center for Social Inclusion (CSI) in 2017. Race Forward then became and is now the home to the Government Alliance on Race and Equity (GARE), a national network of local governments working to achieve racial equity and advance opportunities for all, it publishes Colorlines, and presents Facing Race, the country's largest multiracial conference on racial justice.

The Center for Social Inclusion (CSI) was founded in 2002 by Maya Wiley and Jocelyn Sargent to catalyze community, government, and other institutions to dismantle structural racial inequity and create equitable outcomes for all. CSI worked to link research and advocacy to build capacity in communities of color and to forge links with others to increase our understanding of structural racism, and how it operates, and to develop long-term strategies to dismantle it.
