= 2000 California Proposition 21 =

Referendum on juvenile penalties

Proposition 21
- Treatment of Juvenile Offenders. Initiative Statute

Results
Choice	Votes	%
Yes	4,491,166	62.09%
No	2,742,148	37.91%
Valid votes	7,233,314	100.00%
Invalid or blank votes	0	0.00%
Total votes	7,233,314	100.00%
Registered voters/turnout	7,881,999	91.77%
- Results by county

California Proposition 21, known also as Prop 21, was a proposition proposed and passed in 2000 that increased a variety of criminal penalties for crimes committed by youth and incorporated many youth offenders into the adult criminal justice system. Major provisions of the proposition, as summarized by Attorney General of California are:

- Increased punishment for gang-related felonies; death penalty for gang-related murder; indeterminate life sentences for home-invasion robbery, carjacking, witness intimidation and drive-by shootings; and a new crime of recruiting for gang activities; and authorizes wiretapping for gang activities.
- Requires adult trial for juveniles 14 or older charged with murder or specified sex offenses.
- Elimination of informal probation for juveniles committing felonies.
- Required registration for gang related offenses.
- Designation of additional crimes as violent and serious felonies, thereby making offenders subject to longer sentences.

The proposition received considerable controversy and was subject to vigorous protests by youth and human rights groups. Judges also expressed concern that the law eliminated checks and balances inherent to juvenile fitness hearings, as it effectively placed the power to try juvenile offenders squarely in the hands of a district attorney. Nevertheless, Proposition 21 was eventually passed. Opponents included the Californians for Justice, the Critical Resistance Youth Force Coalition, and the Ella Baker Center for Human Rights. Prop 21 received the support of 62.1% (4,491,166) of the voters while 37.9% (2,742,148) voted against the proposition. Only the comparatively liberal counties of the San Francisco Bay Area voted by majority against the measure.

== Results of vote ==
In February 2001, state Court of Appeal in San Diego invalidated provisions of the law requiring 14- to 17-year-olds to be tried in the adult courts. In February 2002, the Supreme Court of California reversed the Court of Appeal's holding and allowed the provisions to stand as written.
