= Race Forward =

American nonprofit racial justice organization

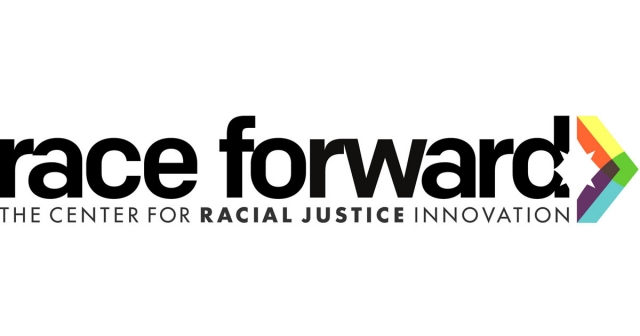
- Formation: 1981
- Type: 501(c)(3)
- Purpose: Racial justice, civil rights
- Director: Glenn Harris (2017 - present) Rinku Sen (2006-2017) Gary Delgado (1981-2006)
- Website: www.raceforward.org
- Formerly called: The Applied Research Center

Race Forward is a nonprofit racial justice organization with offices in Oakland, California, and New York City. It defines its mission as "[helping] people take effective action toward racial equity."

== History ==
Race Forward was founded by Gary Delgado in 1981, and was known as the Applied Research Center until 2013. Delgado remained in leadership until 2006, after which point Rinku Sen became executive director. In 2017, Race Forward merged with the Center for Social Inclusion and is now under the leadership of Glenn Harris, former President of the Center for Social Inclusion. Rinku Sen remained with the organization as a Senior Strategist.

== Activities ==
Race Forward describes itself as advancing the advance of racial justice through research, media, and leadership development. Speaking to NBC in 2015, Executive Director Rinku Sen further characterized Race Forward as focusing on finding ways to re-articulate racism to draw attention to systemic racism. According to Gary Deglado, its work is based on an intersectional understanding of race and the impact of racism alongside other social issues.

In 2015, Race Forward explained its three principles as the use of specific and plain talk to say what you mean about race issues; the focus on impact rather than intention; and the use of strategic terms as well as moral arguments. The organization has published research reports and editorials on issues such as millennials and their attitudes towards race, environmental issues and grassroots organizing, race and religion, and police accountability. John Sullivan, a research associate with Race Forward, has described the organization's research on community demographics and shifting populations of Black communities as a tool to understand and support community organizing efforts.

Race Forward has endorsed the Movement for Black Lives.

== Publications ==
Publications from Race Forward include:

- Beyond the Politics of Place: New Directions in Community Organizing in the 1990s (1994)
- Deliberate Disadvantage: A Case Study of Race Relations in the San Francisco Bay Area (1996)
- Education and Race (1998)
- Crisis: How California Teaching Policies Aggravate Racial Inequality in Public Schools (1999)
- Facing the consequences: An examination of racial discrimination in U.S. public schools (2000)
- Racial profiling and punishment in U.S. public schools: How zero tolerance policies and high stakes testing subvert academic excellence and racial equity (2001)
- "Cruel and Usual: How Welfare 'Reform' Punishes Poor People (2001)
- Welfare Reality (2001)
- Mapping the Immigrant Infrastructure (2002)
- Profiled and punished: How San Diego schools undermine Latino and African American student achievement (2002)
- Multiracial Formations (2003)
- Race and Recession (May 2009)
- Don’t call them “Post-Racial”: Millennials’’ attitudes on race, racism, and key systems in our society. (2011)
- Shattered families: The perilous intersection of immigration enforcement and the child welfare system (2011)
- Racial Equity Impact Assessment Toolkit

Race Forward publishes the daily news site Colorlines, published by Executive Director Rinku Sen. Colorlines was initially a magazine, and it transformed into a website in 2010.

In 2015, Race Forward launched an interactive multimedia tool called "Clocking-In," designed to highlight race and gender inequality in service industries.
