= Scurlock =

Scurlock is a surname. Notable people with the surname include:

- Addison N. Scurlock (1883–1964), American photographer
- Doc Scurlock (1850–1929), American old west figure; part of Lincoln County War
- Eddy C. Scurlock (1905–1988), American oil tycoon
- Herbert Clay Scurlock (1875–1952), American biochemist
- James Scurlock (born 1971), American documentary filmmaker
- John Scurlock (c. 1842–1890), American minister, editor and politician
- Kliph Scurlock (born 1973), American musician
- Mary Steele, née Scurlock (1678–1718), Welsh wife of Irishman Sir Richard Steele
- Mial Scurlock (1809–1836), a defender in the Battle of the Alamo
- Mike Scurlock (born 1972), American football player
- Ovie Scurlock (1918–2016), American jockey
- Scott Scurlock (1955–1996), American criminal

== See also ==
- Scurlockstown, a townland in Scurlockstown civil parish, barony of Lower Deece, County Meath, Ireland
- Scurlockstown, Burry, a townland in Burry civil parish, barony of Upper Kells, County Meath, Ireland
- Scurlockstown (civil parish), civil parish in County Meath, Ireland, which the R164 road runs through
- Scurlockstown, Clonarney, a townland in Clonarney civil parish, barony of Delvin, County Westmeath, Ireland
- Scurlockstown, Portloman, a townland in Portloman civil parish, barony of Corkaree, County Westmeath, Ireland
- Scurlock Foundation, charitable organization in Houston, Texas
- Scurlock Oil Company, Texas corporation founded by Eddy C. Scurlock
  - Eddy Refining Company, oil refinery founded by Eddy C. Scurlock
- Scurlock Publishing Company, magazine and book publisher in Texarkana, Texas
- Killing of James Scurlock
