= Afrikan Black Coalition =

Group of student organizations in California, US

The Afrikan Black Coalition (ABC) are a group of student organizations for black students at University of California schools, formed to unite and solve issues concerning academic policy, campus social atmosphere, and matriculation of black students to the university.

== History ==
In 2003, founding member Jewel Love, a major in Black Studies at the University of California at Santa Barbara, brought together student leaders from the Black/African student organizations in the UC system. Founding members included Ainye Long and Edwina Williams (University of California, Santa Cruz), Na'Shaun Neal and Catherine Sylvester (University of California, Los Angeles), Raniyah Abdus-Samad and Renita Chaney (University of California, Berkeley), Venita Goodwin, Adia Smith, Isaac Frederick and Naseem Beauchman (University of California, Davis), Tiana Lynch (University of California, Irvine), and Stephanie Akpa (University of California, San Diego). The first meeting was in the fall of 2003 held at the University of California, Santa Cruz. At the first meeting, the following schools were in attendance: Santa Barbara, San Diego, Santa Cruz, Los Angeles, Davis, and Berkeley.

Subsequent meetings were held at Berkeley, San Diego, Santa Cruz, and Los Angeles. In the spring of 2004, University of California, Riverside was added, and in 2007, University of California, Merced.

The first UC ABC action was held on the campus of UC San Diego in coordination with the progressive students of color at UCSD during the UCSA Students of Color Conference to protest the hostile educational environment. This was the first coordinated action of the organization. Approximately 50 students from the various UC-ABC schools attended direct action.

== Structure ==
The Organizing Board of UC ABC consists of President, Vice President, Secretary, Treasurer, and Conference Coordinator.

== Conference history ==
In 2004 the University of California African Black Coalition held its first annual conference at UC Santa Cruz. The Conference Chair was UCSC ABC rep, Ainye Long, External Vice Chair for UCSC'c African/Black Student Alliance ("ABSA"). Guest speakers included Professors Trica Rose, George Lipsitz, and David Anthony. The conference was successful by all standards and has continued on since that time. The conferences are tailored to meet the social and political needs of Black/African students in the UC system.

In 2005, the conference was held at UC San Diego. The Coalition president was Catherine Sylvester.

In 2006, the conference was held at UC Davis.

In 2007, the conference was held at Santa Barbara.

In 2008, the fifth conference was held at UC Irvine. The Coalition co-presidents were Lonneshia Webb and Christina Williams. The chair of fundraising was Melanie Garber. The site committee co-chairs were Ashley Turner and Alexandria Gurley.

In 2009, the sixth conference was held at UC Merced.

In 2010, the seventh conference was held at UC Riverside. The conference co-chairs were Stacey Hartnett and Khiana Ferguson.

In 2011, the eighth conference was held at UCLA. The conference chair was Adrien Sebro.

In 2012, the ninth Conference was held at UC Berkeley.

In 2013, the tenth Conference was held at UC San Diego. The conference chair was Grant White.

In 2014, the eleventh Conference was held at UC Santa Cruz. Angela Davis and Ambassador Atallah Shabazz attended.

In 2015, the twelfth Conference was held at UC Irvine. Elaine Brown and Wade Noble attended. The conference co-chairs were Jazmyne McNesse and Angelique McGrue.

In 2016, the thirteenth Conference was scheduled to be held at UC Santa Barbara.

In 2017, the Fourteenth Conference was held at CSU Long Beach. Speakers included Boyce Watkins, Bakari Sellers, Monique W Morris EdD, screening of #Bars4Justice documentary and Q&A by multimedia activists Queen Muhammad Ali & Hakeem Khaaliq of Nation19, Angela Rye, Za Za Ali, Nuri Muhammad, and Key Note address by Minister Louis Farrakhan January 14, 2017.
