= Byhalia Pipeline =

Proposed Memphis-based pipeline

- Location: Memphis, Tennessee
- Result: Pipeline project cancellation

The Byhalia Pipeline, also referred to as the Byhalia Connection Pipeline, was a proposed 49-mile crude oil pipeline project in Memphis, Tennessee. Proposed by two companies, Plains All American Pipeline and Valero Energy, it was canceled in July 2021 after months of activism and resistance from organizations including Memphis Community Against the Pipeline (MCAP), Protect Our Aquifer, the Memphis and Mid-South Chapter of The Climate Reality Project, and other partnered organizations. Opposition to the pipeline was based primarily around impact concerns for the Memphis drinking water aquifer below the intended pipeline location that supplies drinking water to approximately 1 million people. Plans for the Byhalia Connection pipeline project were called off after a statement from Plains All American Pipeline director of communications that the project was no longer being pursued "primarily due to lower U.S. oil production resulting from the COVID-19 pandemic".

== Pipeline project ==
The Byhalia Connection project was intended to connect two existing crude oil pipelines, the Diamond Pipeline based in Memphis, Tennessee and the Capline Pipeline connecting central Illinois and the U.S. Gulf Coast. Byhalia Pipeline, LLC, a joint venture between Valero and Plains All American, stated that through the connection, the company would be able to transport barrels from regions that produce crude oil in Texas and Oklahoma to areas further west, north, and to the U.S. Gulf Coast where it is needed by oil refineries. The companies asserted that the pipeline would be "strengthening the region's economic vitality and America's energy independence", while the officer director of the Southern Environmental Law Center stated the citizens would "bear a lot of risk and almost no benefits".

Additionally, the proposed pipeline would have crossed over the Memphis Sand Aquifer. This aquifer supplies clean drinking water to Memphis and Shelby county, the largest metropolitan center that is exclusively supplied by groundwater. Because crude oil is known to contain carcinogens, all Memphis' citizens would have suffered if this pipeline spilled or leaked into the already vulnerable aquifer. Experts suggest that 25 million gallons of groundwater can be contaminated by only one pound of crude oil. The protection of the aquifer and the injustices surrounding the pipeline construction sparked much activism and resistance.

== Activism and resistance ==
Local activism was led by a grassroots organization, Memphis Community Against the Pipeline (MCAP), co-founded by Justin J. Pearson, Kizzy Jones, and Kathy Robinson, and Protect our Aquifer, founded by Ward Archer. National awareness was raised through the Memphis and Mid-South Chapter of The Climate Reality Project co-founded by Duffy-Marie Arnoult and Vance LaVelle with a local appearance from Climate Reality founder Al Gore in the historically black Boxtown neighborhood in Memphis, Tennessee. These efforts led to a variety of celebrities and public figures speaking out against the pipeline including Danny Glover, Giancarlo Esposito, Jane Fonda and others.

In early 2021, a spokesperson for Byhalia Pipeline, LLC stated that the planned route was decided as it was "the path of least resistance". This statement was considered a gaffe, in the way that it appeared to refer to the historic black neighborhood of Boxtown through which the pipeline would be constructed. Rev. Dr. William Barber II, co-chairman of the national Poor People's Campaign made a public appearance at a Memphis rally following "the path of least resistance" statement, which became a main theme of his speech.

A lawsuit was filed by Memphis Community Against Pollution Inc., Protect our Aquifer, and the Sierra Club against the U.S. Army Corps of Engineers on the subject of the Byhalia Pipeline, contesting that the Corps of Engineers approved filing of Nationwide Permit 12 needed for the Byhalia Pipeline ignored potential environmental consequences of contamination to rivers, the Memphis Sand Aquifer, and the drinking water of the local population of approximately 1 million residents. Congressman Steve Cohen and Congresswoman Alexandria Ocasio-Cortez led in a letter alongside 26 congress members requesting that the Biden administration reconsider the Army Corps of Engineers Nationwide Permit 12 filed for the Byhalia Pipeline.

While activists sought intervention from the United States Department of Transportation (USDOT), Transportation Secretary, Pete Buttigieg, stated that the USDOT could only regulate the pipeline once it is in the ground and would not halt the project prior to it being placed in service.

During the period of opposition, the Memphis City Council proposed an ordinance to require the approval by the city council for the underground storage or transportation of hazardous materials.

== Project cancellation ==
The cancellation of the project was announced on July 2, 2021, by Byhalia Connection, LLC through its director of communications, who also stated "Pipelines continue to play a critical role in safely transporting energy products from where energy is produced to where it is refined and turned into consumer goods that benefit our lives. As part of any shift to lower carbon energy, hydrocarbons will continue to be a critical part of meeting increasing global need for affordable, reliable energy. Access to all forms of energy improves quality of life, education and economic opportunity for individuals and communities throughout North America and across the globe".

Shelby County Mayor Lee Harris stated that "The cancellation of the construction of the Byhalia Connection Pipeline is great news for the community that has fought tooth and nail for this result."
