= Black Lives Matter movement in popular culture =

The Black Lives Matter movement has been depicted and documented in various artistic forms and mediums including film, song, television, and the visual arts. In some instances this has taken place in the form of protest art (also referred to as activist art or "artivism"). These cultural representations have also grown organically among artists who seek to partake in activist efforts in support or in recognition of the Black Lives Matter movement. The themes conveyed in these artistic works address the history of racism and injustice toward people of color in the United States and typically express sentiments of anger and fear as well as solace and hope.

== Film ==
External videos
- 8 Minutes and 46 Seconds: The Killing of George Floyd (2020), documentary
- "Black Lives Matter explained: The history of a movement (2020), documentary
- "The Rise of Black Lives Matter" (2016), documentary

- 3 1/2 Minutes, 10 Bullets (2015) is based on the events surrounding the 2012 shooting of Jordan Russell Davis.
- 8:46 (2020) is a performance special by American comedian Dave Chappelle about violence against African Americans.
- Bars4Justice (2015) is an American short documentary film directed by Queen Muhammad Ali and Hakeem Khaaliq. The film was recorded in Ferguson, Missouri during the first anniversary of the shooting of Michael Brown August 9–10, 2015.
- Fruitvale Station (2013) is an American biographical drama film about the shooting of Oscar Grant. It was written and directed by Ryan Coogler.
- The Provocateurs: A Master Series which features talks with established, provocative Black artists from all fields about their works within a politically radical framework. It was produced by Black Lives Matter Arts+Culture.
- What it Means to be Human, by Cornel West, Collins Distinguished Speakers' Lecture, University of Oregon on April 26, 2019.
- Whose Streets? (2017) is an American documentary film about the shooting of Michael Brown and the Ferguson uprising. Directed by Sabaah Folayan and co-directed by Damon Davis.
- "Holding a Black Lives Matter Sign in America's Most Racist Town" (2020) is a short film by Rob Bliss. The film depicts the titular events and racist passerby yelling obscenities at Bliss.
- Night Call (2024) is a Belgian-French film directed by Michiel Blanchart, set over the course of a night amid a Black Lives Matter protest in Belgium.

== Television ==
=== Series and documentary films ===
- Rest in Power: The Trayvon Martin Story (2018) is an American documentary television series that premiered on July 30, 2018, on Paramount Network. The six-episode series documents the shooting of Trayvon Martin and explores the racial tension in the United States that was brought about in its wake.
- Stay Woke: The Black Lives Matter Movement (2016) is an American television documentary film starring Jesse Williams about the Black Lives Matter movement, and the events that led to the uprising of the movement. The phrase "stay woke" refers to a continuing awareness of issues concerning social justice and racial equality and came to widespread use as a result of Black Lives Matter.
- 13th (2016) is an American documentary film featuring scholars, activists, and politicians. It focuses on racial inequality in the United States, emphasizing the notion that incarceration is used as a way to control Black and Brown people.

=== Episodes ===
External videos
- "It's Time for Change in the US", The Late Late Show with James Corden, June 1, 2020 — including Dave's performance of "Black" at the 2020 Brit Awards on February 18, 2020.

- The ABC sitcom Black-ish featured a debate about Black Lives Matter in the episode "Hope".
- The primetime Fox drama Empire aired season 3 episode 2 on September 28, 2016, which portrays Black Lives Matter and police brutality when Andre Lyon is attacked by police officers for moving boxes outside his home, without any wrongdoing.
- Black Lives Matter appeared in an episode of Law & Order: Special Victims Unit.
- The television drama Scandal depicted Black Lives Matter in its March 5, 2015, episode that showed a police officer shooting an unarmed black teenager.
- Station 19 season 4 (2021) deals intensively with BLM in nearly every episode.
- Grey's Anatomy season 17 (2021) deals less intensively with BLM than its spinoff Station 19, but it comes up in many episodes.

== Literature ==
=== Books ===
- All-American Boys (2015) is a young adult novel by Jason Reynolds and Brendan Kiely. The book is narrated and told from the points of view of Rashad Butler and Quinn Collins. Rashad is a sixteen-year-old African-American boy who is brutalized by Officer Galluzzo because he's mistaken for a shoplifter. Quinn Collins is a seventeen-year-old Caucasian-American boy who witnesses Rashad being beaten by his best friend's older brother. Rashad doesn't want to become a symbol or an icon even though he becomes a hashtag: #RashadIsAbsentAgainToday. Quinn wants to stay neutral in order to stay loyal to his friend but his conscience says otherwise. But each boy has to come to terms with the racism that still plagues the world in order to ensure that no one else will ever be absent again because of police brutality.
- The Hate U Give (2017) is a young adult novel by Angie Thomas. It is Thomas's debut novel, expanded from a short story she wrote in college in reaction to the police shooting of Oscar Grant. The book is narrated by Starr Carter, a 16-year-old black girl from a poor neighborhood who attends an elite private school in a predominantly white, affluent part of the city. Her two worlds collide when her childhood friend, Khalil Harris, is shot and killed by a cop. Since Khalil was unarmed, he soon becomes a hashtag and adds fuel to the BLM Movement. But only Starr can tell the world the truth about what happened the night Khalil died. The film adaptation was released the following year.
- I Can't Breathe: A Killing on Bay Street (2017) book by Matt Taibbi, published by Spiegel & Grau, about the death of Eric Garner.
- Dear Martin (2017) is a young adult novel by Nic Stone. The novel is about an African-American teenage boy named Justyce McAllister who is forced to take a closer look at race relations during the rise of the BLM Movement after he's racially profiled. He writes to the late Martin Luther King Jr. in order to see if nonviolence can still work in the present-day.
- I Am Alfonso Jones (2017) is the first graphic novel that focuses on police brutality and the BLM Movement. The graphic novel is written by Tony Medina and illustrated by Stacey Robinson and John Jennings. Alfonso Jones, an Afro-Latino teenage boy, is shot and killed by a New York City police officer after a customer mistakes a coat hanger he was holding for a gun. While his death adds fuel to the BLM Movement, Alfonso's ghost rides a "Soul Train" filled with other black New Yorkers who were also victims of police brutality.
- Ghost Boys (2018) is a children's novel by Jewell Parker Rhodes. The novel is told from the point of view of a twelve-year-old boy named Jerome Rogers who is murdered by a Chicago police officer after his toy gun is mistaken for a real gun. Jerome's ghost sees how his death affects his family, his friend, and even the daughter of the cop who murdered him. He also meets the ghost of Emmett Till among other ghost boys who were victims of racist attacks.

=== Magazines ===
- The February 2015 issue of Essence magazine and the cover was devoted to Black Lives Matter.
- In December 2015, BLM was a contender for the Time magazine Person of the Year award, coming in fourth of the eight candidates.
- Black Lives Matter Movement: A movement in photos ABC news published an issue featuring the Black Lives Matter movement in photos. The photos consist of BLM protests ranging from 2013 to 2021, showing protests that stemmed from the killings of Black and Brown people, at the hands of police.

== Music ==
The Seven Last Words of the Unarmed

1. “Why do you have your guns out?” – Kenneth Chamberlain, 66
2. “What are you following me for?” – Trayvon Martin, 17
3. “Mom, I'm going to college.” – Amadou Diallo, 23
4. “I don't have a gun. Stop shooting.” – Michael Brown, 18
5. “You shot me! You shot me!” – Oscar Grant, 22
6. “It's not real.” – John Crawford, 22

7. “I can't breathe.” – Eric Garner, 43

— Choral composition by Joel Thompson

- "Alright" (2015) is a song by Kendrick Lamar, taken from his third studio album To Pimp a Butterfly
- "Cop vs. Phone Girl" (2016) is the lead single from Third Eye Blind's EP, We Are Drugs.
- "Don't Shoot" single is a tribute to Michael Brown by American rapper The Game featuring Rick Ross, 2 Chainz, Diddy, Fabolous, Wale, DJ Khaled, Swizz Beatz, Yo Gotti, Curren$y, Problem, King and recording group TGT performing the chorus.
- "Lavender" (2017), a song by American rapper Snoop Dogg, is a remixed version of the BadBadNotGood (BBNG) song "Lavender" with lyrics added which addressed the issue of police brutality in the United States.
- "Loyal Like Sid & Nancy" (2017) is a song by American indie pop band Foster the People from their third studio album Sacred Hearts Club.
- "Rockstar" (2020) is a song by American rapper DaBaby, featuring vocals from American rapper Roddy Ricch. The song was released on April 24, 2020, as the lead single from DaBaby's third studio album Blame It on Baby.
- The Seven Last Words of the Unarmed is a choral composition by Atlanta-based composer Joel Thompson.
- "White Privilege II" (2016) is a song by American hip hop duo Macklemore & Ryan Lewis from their second album This Unruly Mess I've Made. The song, a sequel to Macklemore's solo song "White Privilege" from his first album The Language of My World (2005), discusses white privilege and the social movement associated with Black Lives Matter.

== Art ==
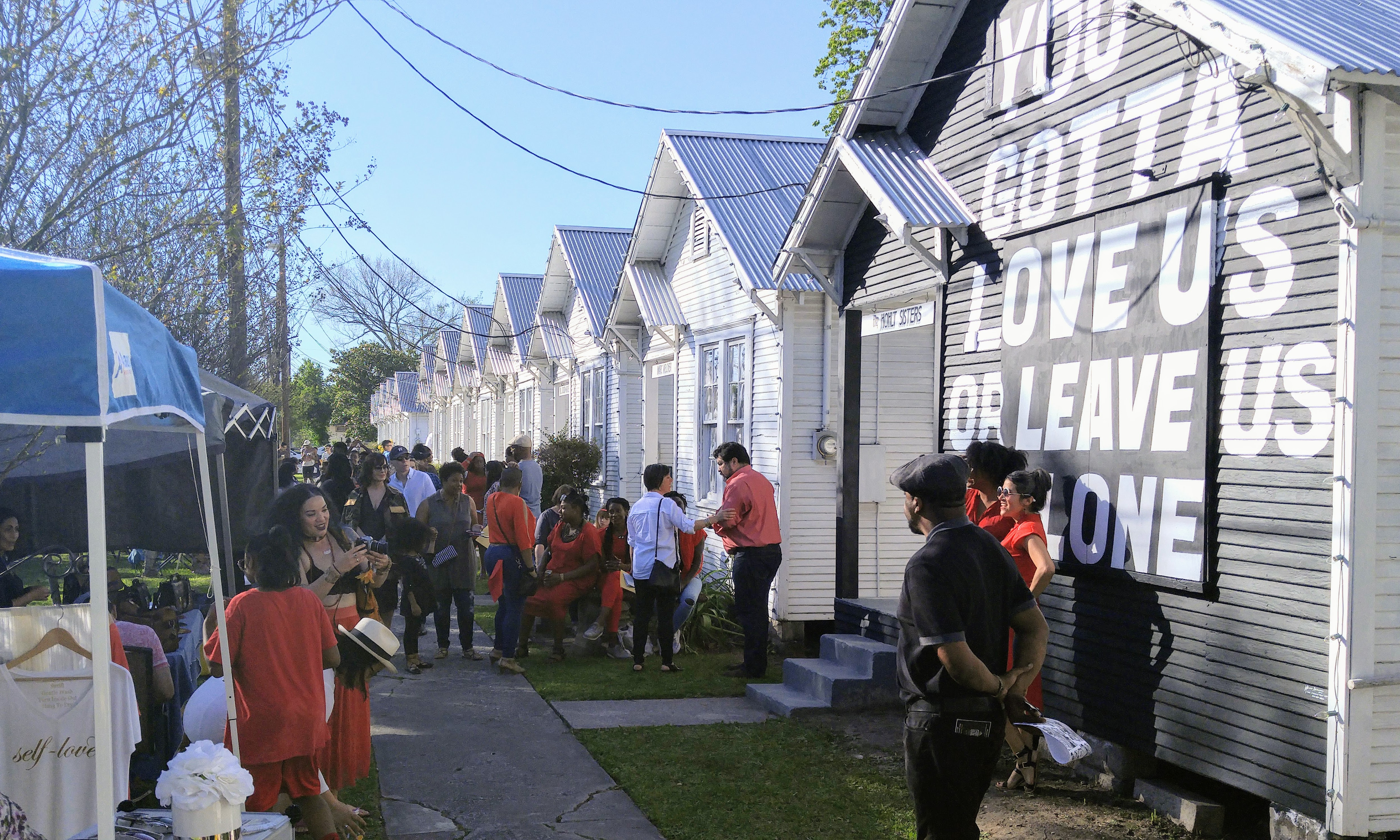
Project Row Houses Round 46 Opening — Black Women Artists for Black Lives Matter on March 25, 2017.

- Our Lady of Ferguson is an icon of the Madonna and Child, which depicts the Virgin Mary as a Black Madonna, was created in 2016 by Mark Doox, an iconographer, and was commissioned by Rev. Mark Francisco Bozzuti-Jones, an Episcopal priest at Trinity Church in Manhattan.
- "Black Women Artists for Black Lives Matter at Project Row Houses" exhibition – An exhibition of works by Black Women Artists for Black Lives Matter was held at Project Row Houses in Houston, Texas from March 25 through June 4, 2017. "You gotta love us or leave us alone" is painted on the front of the center row-house.
- Taking a Stand in Baton Rouge is a photograph of Ieshia Evans, a nurse from Pennsylvania, being arrested by police officers dressed in riot gear during a protest in Baton Rouge, Louisiana, on 9 July 2016. The protest began in the aftermath of the shooting by police of Alton Sterling and Philando Castile.

=== Street art and paintings ===
Street murals and art began to be created in the mid-twentieth century, but became a way of "reappropriating public space in the name of inclusion, diversity, and equality" in the 1960s, such as the Wall of Respect made in Bronzeville, Chicago in 1967. It features portraits of noted Black figures including Harriet Tubman, Muhammad Ali, and Malcolm X.

==== Street painting ====
A number of cities have painted murals of "Black Lives Matter" in large yellow letters on their streets. While some find that the street paintings are an important validation of the movement, critics charge that it is a distraction from working on meaningful change.

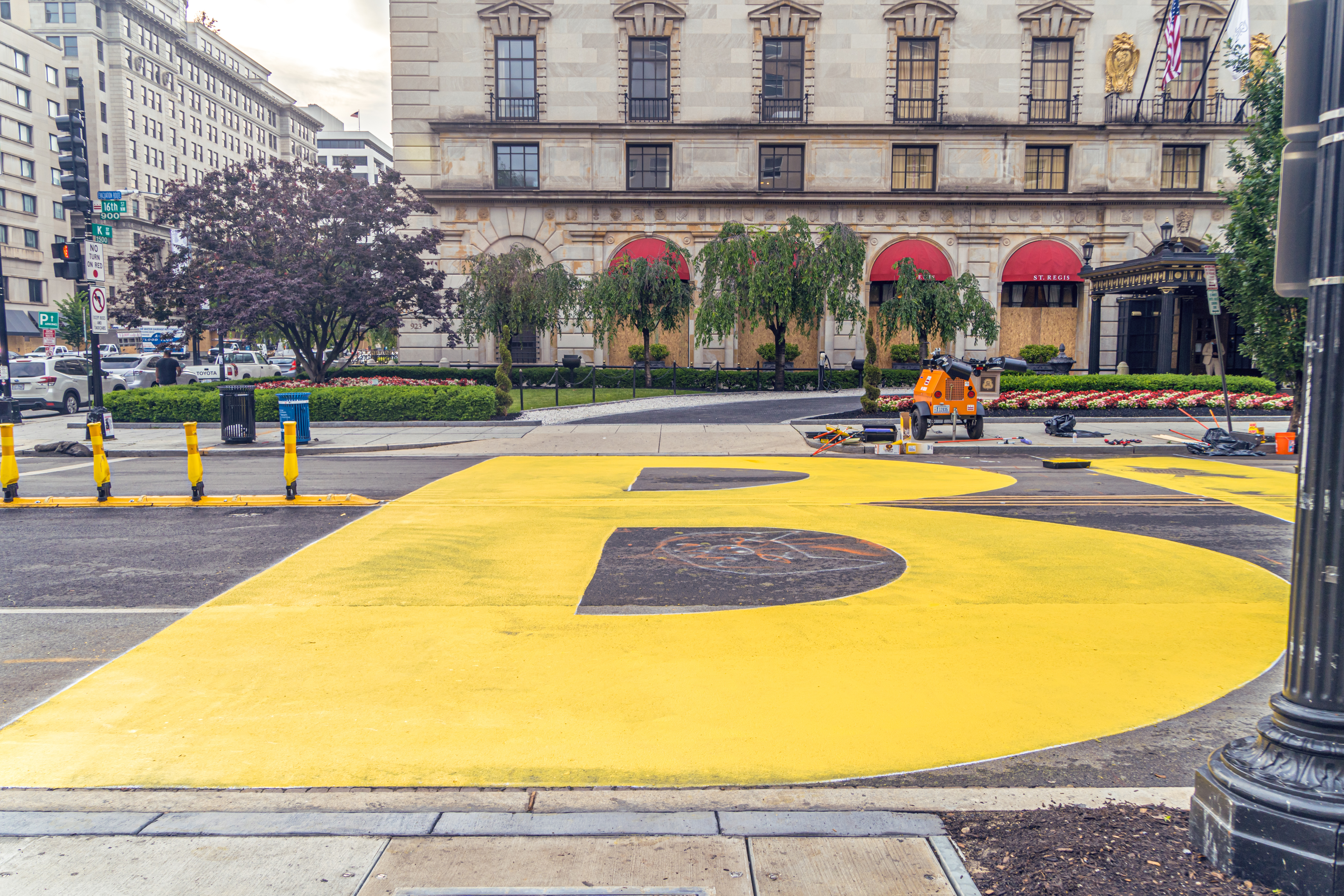
Part of the mural reading "Black Lives Matter" painted at Black Lives Matter Plaza, Washington, D.C., in June 2020

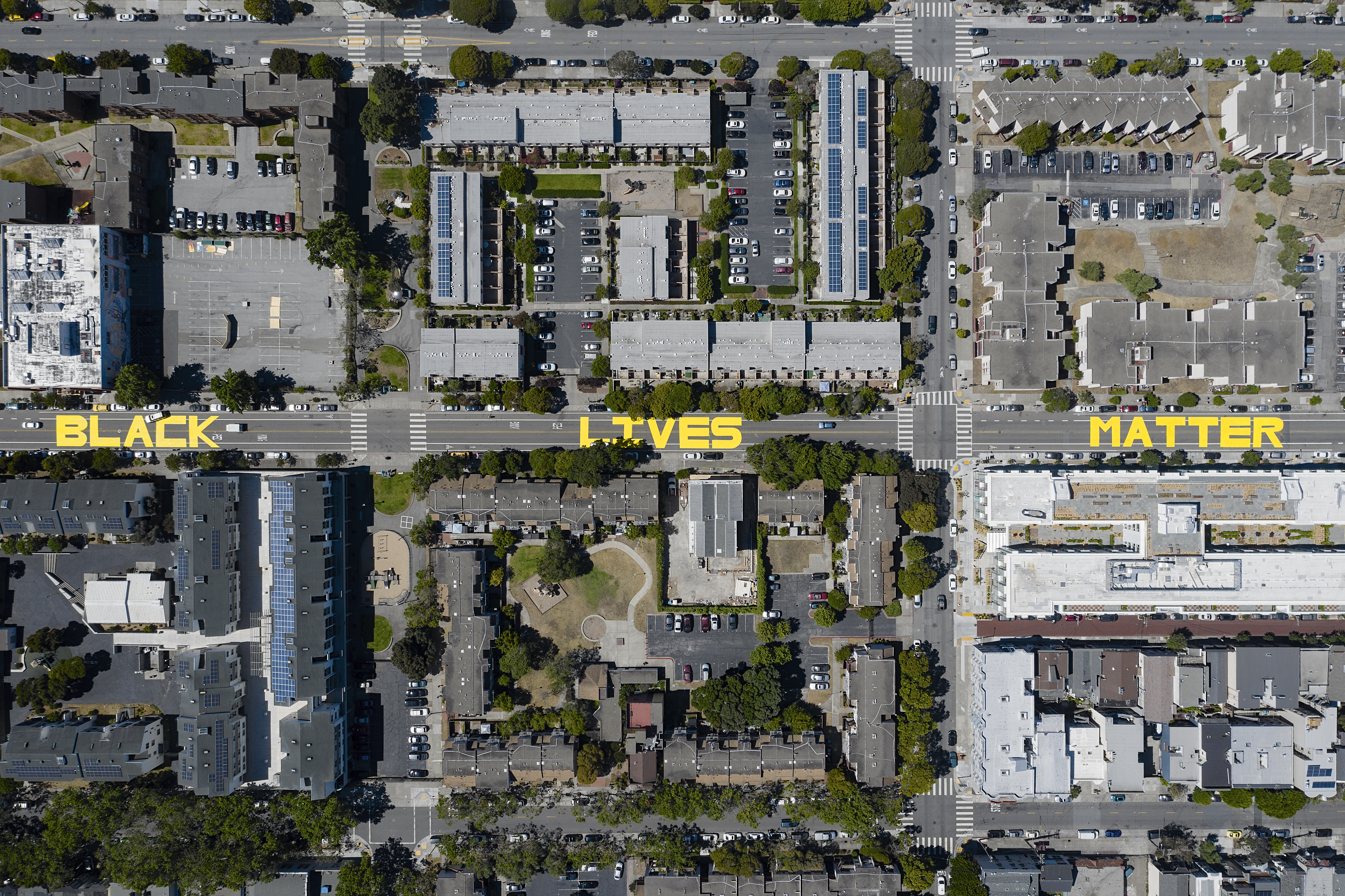
Black Lives Matter mural in San Francisco

- Black Lives Matter street painting of "Black Lives Matter" is painted in massive yellow letters and naming of Black Lives Matter Plaza on 16th Street in Washington, D.C. was ordered in early June 2020 by Muriel Bowser, the mayor of the city. The mural was painted near the White House on several blocks of 16th Street by local artists and volunteers, such as several people from the Department of Public Works.

And we had the opportunity to send that message loud and clear on a very important street in our city. That message is to the American people that black lives matter, black humanity matters, and we as a city raise that up.

— Muriel Bowser, Mayor of Washington, D.C. and painting Black Lives Matter on the street near the White House

- Black Lives Matter street painting in Birmingham, Alabama — "Black Lives Matter" was painted in massive yellow letters on 1st Avenue South between 16th and 17th Streets.
- Black Lives Matter street paintings in massive yellow letters have also been made in Brooklyn, Los Angeles, Seattle, Charlotte, Denver, Dallas, and in front of the California State Capitol in Sacramento, California.
- In Raleigh, North Carolina, the words "End Racism Now" was painted on the city's streets after the murder of George Floyd.

==== Street art ====
- New York street art — The murder of George Floyd, the deaths of Breonna Taylor, Eric Garner, Elijah McClain, and others due to police violence triggered the creation of street art in New York City. The art represents a memorial to those who died as well as a means to support the Black Lives Matter movement which include Taking the knee, Breonna Taylor, Color is not a crime, and Say their names.
- Various artists took to the streets of New York, in the Harlem and Lower Manhattan areas to express their support of the movement by painting the words Black Lives Matter in the streets in Bold letters, adding their own twist and using some of the letters to promote a message.

=== Social media ===
External images
- Collage of social media Black Lives Matter images by Teddy Phillips, Naimah Thomas, and other artists
- "Just a reminder that MLK Jr...", by Dani Coke
- "Why COVID-19 is Ravaging Black America", by Dani Coke
- Unnamed (Do nothing cycle), by Ciara LeRoy
- "Freedom", by Ciara LeRoy

- Portraits — Works of art are also circulated through social media, like Instagram, by artists who are grappling with the tragedies that have sparked and continue throughout the Black Lives Matter movement. In some cases their works are portraits of the victims of police violence, such as George Floyd by Teddy Phillips or Breonna Taylor by Naimah Thomas.
- Messages — In other cases, images are meant to convey a specific message. Dani Coke's image is illustrated with the words "Just a reminder that MLK Jr was not a quiet, gentle, law-abiding peacekeeper but a radical disrupter who rejected passive inaction & fought for justice through organized civil disobedience." She also created "Why COVID-19 is Ravaging Black America". Ciara LeRoy, a lettering artist by trade, created embroidered works. One is FREEDOM, FREEDOM, FREEDOM. Another states "tragedy. shock. sadness. outrage. blame. blame. blame. what do we do? talk. talk. talk. post. post. post. DO NOTHING IN YOUR DAILY LIFE TO DISMANTLE OPPRESSION... repeat." A picture of Kristin Garvey's handwritten poster was seen over social media by Jennifer Rosen Heinz who then recruited Kristin Joiner locally to transform it into the Black Lives Matter-themed image "In this house, we believe" that has since gone viral nationwide.

== See also ==
- Civil rights movement in popular culture
- LA 92
- Black power
