= Radio Bums =

Music production and publishing company

- Formerly: Da 40 Thieves / 5280Ft Music
- Type: Privately Held Company
- Founded: 1996
- Founder: Hakeem Khaaliq
- Number of locations: Burbank, CA, Scottsdale, AZ, Honolulu, HI,
- Area served: Worldwide
- Services: Film production, television production, Music Production, Music Publishing, Multimedia
- Website: www.radiobums.com

Radio Bums is a multimedia, music production, and music publishing company founded by multimedia activist Hakeem Khaaliq in 1996.

== History ==
Radio Bums can be traced back to 1994, where Khaaliq's first official album, No Coast Line, was released under production company, "Da 40 Thieves Music Productions," which was later changed to "Radio Bums." The name was coined by Hakeem in 1997 after ending his role as co-host of KGNU's Eclipse show with DJ Chris Nathan. Hakeem, a well known producer in Denver at the time, produced and published the soundtrack "The Bizness" and other subsequent releases under the "Radio Bums" moniker.

== TV Film & Multimedia ==
2020 - Comin' Up Short - Nation19 - Music Supervision, Music publishing, Sound effex, Foley

2016 - WaronUS - UNGASS - Music Supervision, Music publishing

2015 - "Bars4Justice" - Nation19 - Music Supervision, Music publishing, Music licensing

2013 - "The Tale of Timmy Two Chins" - Showtime - Underscore, Music Publishing, Music licensing

2012 - "APDTA" - Nation19 - Music Video Direction, MV Production

2007 - "Hogan Knows Best - VH1 - Music cues various episodes, Music Publishing, Music licensing

2007 - "Adventures in Hollyhood - MTV - Music cues episodes 1-9, Music Supervision, Music Publishing, Music licensing

2006 - "The Champagne Gang - Maverick Entertainment Group - Underscore, Music Publishing

2005 - "Beauty Shop" - MGM - Music Supervision, Remix (Promo)

2005 - "CrossBones" - Lions Gate Films - Soundtrack, Music Publishing, Music licensing

2004 - "Oopdeewopdee" (Motown/Universal) - Music Video Direction, MV Production

2003 - "Celebrity Chefs" w host Tank (Radio Bums) (television pilot) TV Show Creation, Production, Scoring, Music licensing

2003 - "Big Snoop Dogg: Raw N Uncut" - Radio Bums - Film production, DVD Authoring

2003 - "Honolulu" - Flip The Bird Entertainment - Music Video Direction, MV Production, Publishing, Music licensing

2001 - "Cherish" Heads High Entertainment - Video Production, Enhanced CD production

1998 - "Tha Bizness" - Radio Bums / Paragon Pictures - Film production, Underscore, Music Publishing, Soundtrack

== Music & Radio ==
2020 - "Say it Louder" - LA United (Shorty from Da Lench Mob), WC, Tank, Big Tray Deee (Tha Eastsiders), Boo Ya T.R.I.B.E., Mike Anthony, Kid Frost, Squeek Ru, Masaniai Muhammad Ali - (Radio Bums)

2012 - "APDTA" - Haas Diop, Nation19, and the Radio bums - (Radio Bums)

2007 - "Return to the Basics" Tassho Pearce feat Evidence, DJ Babu - (Flip The Bird Entertainment)

2007 - "Room Service / Flip The Bird Breaks 12" Tassho Pearce EMIRC & Q-Bert - (Thud Rumble / Flip The Bird Entertainment)

2005 - "Time Zones Mixtape" Fatman Scoop, DJ Mr. Vince, Radio Bums, DJ Syze One, Tassho Pearce - (Flip The Bird Entertainment)

2003 - "Get Down" - Feat. Bishop Lamont, Roscoe, PT From Lifestyle, Hakeem Khaaliq (Radio Bums)

2003 - "Say it Loud" - LA United (Shorty from Da Lench Mob), WC, Tank, KAM, Boo Ya T.R.I.B.E., Mike Anthony, Kid Frost, Squeek Ru) - (Radio Bums)

2004 - "Oopdeewopdee" - NSS16 feat David Banner and Aloe Blacc - (Motown/Universal)

2002 - Snoop Dogg Presents... Doggy Style Allstars Vol. 1 - (Radio Promotion)

2001 - Hip Hop Block Party - Ed Lover, Hakeem Khaaliq, Job Bakama, Dj Envious - (NPG Radio, Radio Bums)

1998 - Where's That From Mixtape - Hakeem Khaaliq, DJ Chonz, PT Da Pimp a.k.a. Petey Helm - (Radio Bums)

== Commercial ==
Pei Wei (Multiple campaigns 2011-2015) (Music Supervision, Music Licensing, TV spot Direction, production)

P. F. Chang's China Bistro (Multiple campaigns 2011-2015) (Music Supervision, Music Licensing, TV spot Direction, production)

Life Campaign - Karl Kani (Web Design, Web Development, Print design)

Forever Sport Kobe Campaign - Adidas (Treatment)

Snoop Boards - Radio Bums (Product Design, TV ad production)

Cokedeewopdee ad - Coca-Cola - Invisible Entertainment/ Universal Records (Co-production)

== Links ==
radiobums.com

RADIO BUMS (ASCAP) (Radio Bums published musical works on American Society of Composers Authors and Publishers website)
