= Addison N. Scurlock =

American photographer (1883–1964)

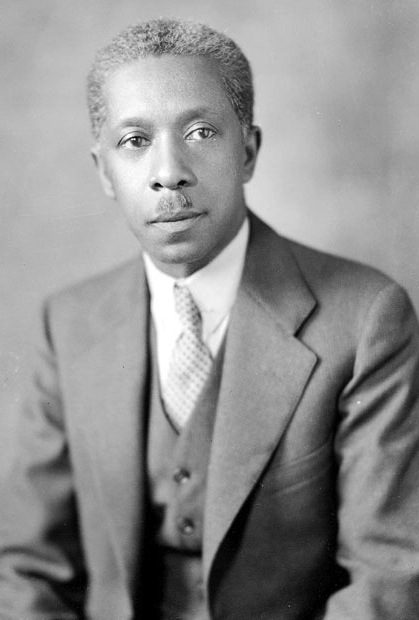
- Scurlock, c. 1925
- Born: June 19, 1883; Fayetteville, North Carolina, U.S.
- Died: December 16, 1964 (aged 81); Washington, D.C., U.S.
- Occupations: Photographer, businessman
- Notable work: Photographing Black Washington
- Spouse: Mamie Estelle Fearing (m. 1912)
- Children: Robert Saunders Scurlock George Hardison Scurlock
- Relatives: Herbert Clay Scurlock (brother)

Addison Norton Scurlock (June 19, 1883 – December 16, 1964) was an American photographer, founder of The Scurlock Studio, and businessman who became prominent in the early and mid-20th century for photographing Black Washington.

== Early life ==
Addison Norton Scurlock was born in Fayetteville, North Carolina, on June 19, 1883. Businessman and Republican politician George C. Scurlock was his father. He had two siblings, including the biochemist Herbert Clay Scurlock.

In 1900 after finishing high school, he moved to Washington, D.C., with his family. Scurlock began an apprenticeship with white photographer Moses P. Rice in order to pursue photography. He apprenticed from 1901 to 1904 before establishing himself as a photographer.

== Scurlock Studio ==
The first Scurlock Studio opened in 1904 on S Street in Northwest D.C., which was his parents' home. In 1906, the family and studio moved to Florida Avenue. Two years later, they moved to 1202 T Street NW. Addison opened a studio at 900 U Street NW in 1911. By 1911, Mamie Estelle Fearing had already begun working with Addison, and the following year, they were married. At the U Street studio, Addison erected a display case, which was a popular attraction at the heart of Black Washington on Black Broadway.

Many of his works are collected in the Smithsonian Online Virtual Archives. In the National Museum of American History Archives Center, the Scurlock Studio Records contain hundreds of photos taken by the Scurlock family that depict various social events and studio portraits. The collection includes black and white photographs, framed prints, color negatives, and business records. This collection can be used to see the various techniques that Addison Scurlock and his sons used to become revered in the African American community.

Addison Scurlock's sons, George H. and Robert S. Scurlock, joined the business in the 1930s. Trained in high school by their father, the Scurlock sons adopted the signature "Scurlock Look" to photograph hundreds of subjects in a variety of locations. George and Robert were also featured in black newspapers and magazines due to their focus on news photography. Beyond capturing moments in Washington D.C, the sons started the Capitol School of Photography in 1948 to teach World War II veterans that were interested in photography. The style of their photos were heavily praised for showing respect and dignity to their African American subjects. These features helped to combat the negative stereotypes that were present during this time period. The Scurlock Studio family business was operated by Robert until his death in 1994.

== New Negro ==
Madam C. J. Walker (1916), National Portrait Gallery, Washington, D.C.

The work of Addison N. Scurlock and the Scurlock Studio was affiliated with ideas about pride and progress of the New Negro. The location of the studio in Scurlock's home community and its location in Washington, D.C., facilitated this. The Black elite in Washington and everyday African Americans were aware of the power of both photography and capturing their image in positive ways. Scurlock, not only shot portraits, but also events such as church picnics, meetings, and high school graduations. The following is a brief list of the Scurlock Studio's notable subjects.

- Marian Anderson at the Lincoln Memorial
- Anna J. Cooper
- W. E. B. Du Bois
- Howard University
- Martin Luther King Jr.
- Mary Church Terrell and Robert Heberton Terrell
- Booker T. Washington
- Carter G. Woodson
- Jessie De Priest
- Madam C.J. Walker

== Legacy ==
The Scurlock Studio's work is preserved in the Smithsonian's National Museum of American History Archives Center, showcasing Addison Scurlock’s influence on African American photography. His great-nephew, Hakeem Khaaliq, has continued a family tradition in visual arts as a cinematographer and filmmaker, notably with the documentary #Bars4Justice.
