= Tray Little =

American rapper

- Born: June 17, 1994 (age 32)
- Origin: Detroit, Michigan, U.S.
- Genres: Hip hop
- Occupations: Rapper, TikToker
- Years active: 2016–present

Tray Little (born June 17, 1994) is an American rapper, songwriter, producer and social media personality. He gained internet popularity by posting his music and sharing videos on the mobile-app TikTok, amassing over 1.1 million followers in 2020.

== Early life ==
Little was born in Detroit, Michigan and raised by his teenage mother after his father died due to gun violence when Little was 4 years old. Little was introduced to rap he was 9 years old, listening to artists such as Master P, No Limit Soldiers, Silkk The Shocker, Mystikal while taking road trips with his aunt. It was later that Little was introduced to 50 Cent's Get Rich or Die Tryin' album - which he described as an influence to his rap upbringings, "Which really made me want to be a rapper was when 50 Cent came out with 'Get Rich Or Die Tryin.' I was probably about 10 years old and that album really shaped my perspective on rap, just a hardcore image. And he was talking about everything I seen growing up in the streets of Detroit and it was just a tough, hardcore image. And it made me want to look up to him cause I didn’t have my father." Living in the Linwood area of Detroit, he began rapping and songwriting in his teens and later began producing his own music. Some of his work was inspired by his own personal experiences and stories from overcoming the street wars of Detroit.

== Career ==
In December 2016, Tray Little released his first EP titled "From The Ashes," enlisting music producer Seth Anderson from Detroit studio Assemble Sound who helped complete the project. In January 2018, he released his music video for his single "Live It Up" which amassed over 60,000 views on YouTube. Gaining some popularity from his clean-lyrics, Little performed several Detroit shows and headlined for acts such as Christian rock band Newsboys. After joining the mobile-app TikTok, Tray Little started gaining internet popularity in 2019, where he earned several millions of views and likes by posting videos and music on the platform.

After the murder of George Floyd, Little began rapping and using his TikTok platform to bring awareness to racial injustice. In June 2020, a video began circulating on the internet of Little getting in-between protesters, diffusing tension between officers and protestors during the Black Lives Matter movement protests in his hometown of Detroit, Michigan.

In June 2020, Tray Little earned over 1 million followers on the popular video-sharing application TikTok.

On October 30, 2020, Little released his 9-track album entitled "Clouds in the Dirt."

== Musical style ==
Tray Little is known for using clean rap lyrics in his music, which draws from his personal life stories. He describes how he would get inspired by artists such as Travis Scott and Kanye West by watching them tour on YouTube. When asked about his influence with XMPL, Little says "I don’t want to be a Kidz Bop rapper just saying what to do, because rap music is turning up a lot of times but I want to use my story to inspire people."

== Discography ==
=== Extended plays ===
Title	Details
From The Ashes	• Released: December 9, 2016 • Format: Digital download, streaming
Out The Mud	• Released: June 7, 2019 • Format: Digital download, streaming

=== Albums ===
Title	Details
Clouds in the Dirt	• Released: October 30, 2020 • Format: Digital download, streaming

=== Singles as lead artist ===
List of singles as a lead artist, showing year released and album
Title	Year	Album
"Live It Up"	2016	From The Ashes
"Slow Down"	2018	
"Live It Up Remix"	2018	
"Let It Bang"	2018	Out The Mud
"My Mind" (featuring Del)	2018	Out The Mud
"Bad"	2018	
"Celebrate Life"	2018	
"Mirror"	2018	Out The Mud
"Never Quit"	2019	Out The Mud
"Great"	2019	
"Worst Nightmare"	2019	
"Madlit"	2019	
"Rage"	2019	
"Skate"	2020	
"Lost"	2020	
"The Corona"	2020	
"Mask On"	2020	Clouds in the Dirt
"I Can't Breathe (George Floyd)"	2020	

== See also ==
- Detroit hip hop
