= Jack S. Blanton =

American businessman (1927–2013)

Jack Sawtelle Blanton (December 7, 1927 – December 28, 2013) was an American oil industry executive, philanthropist, and civic leader.

== Biography ==
He was born on December 7, 1927, in Shreveport, Louisiana, the son of William N. Blanton (June 23, 1890 – November 27, 1967) and Louise G. Wynn (September 21, 1898 – July 5, 1989). Blanton was raised in Houston, Texas, where his father was general manager of the chamber of commerce. After attending Lamar High School, Blanton earned a B.A. degree at University of Texas at Austin (UT) in 1947 with a double major in government and history, and an L.L.B. at UT Law School in 1950.

In 1950, Blanton began working for Eddy C. Scurlock at Scurlock Oil Company in the Division Order Department. He rose through the company ranks to become its president in 1958, and eventually CEO and chairman in 1983, a year after the company was sold to Ashland Oil. He retired from his position in 1988 to become the president of Eddy Refining Company, his final job.

Blanton was married three times. He married Laura Lee Scurlock (June 4, 1928 – August 6, 1999), daughter of Eddy C. Scurlock; the Laura Lee Blanton Building at Southern Methodist University is named for her. After her death, he married Lucinda B. Bailey (November 4, 1934 – March 2, 2002) on 14 November 2000. She also preceded Blanton in death; he and Virginia "Ginger" Nelson were married on November 30, 2002 (she survived his passing). He and his first wife had three children: Elizabeth Louise Blanton (born February 1, 1951), Jack Sawtelle Blanton Jr. (born July 28, 1953), and Eddy Scurlock Blanton (born May 25, 1955).

Blanton was a civic leader in Houston, where he served as the chairman of the board of Houston Endowment Inc. He also served on the boards of The Methodist Hospital Healthcare System, the Texas Medical Center, the Houston Zoo, and the Jesse H. Jones Graduate School of Management at Rice University, among others. From 1985 to 1991, he was a Regent of the University of Texas, appointed by Governor Mark White. He served as chairman from 1987 to 1989. During this time, Blanton had a hand in influencing the Texas Legislature to increase support for the University of Texas System.

During the oil and real estate crises of the 1980s, Blanton served as chairman of the Greater Houston Chamber of Commerce, where he notably helped resolve conflict with effective communication and good working relations.

In 1997, the University of Texas at Austin renamed its art museum the Blanton Museum of Art in his honor after receiving a $12 million donation from Houston Endowment Inc.
