= Neal Fredericks =

American cinematographer (1969–2004)

- Born: Neal Leslie Fredericks; July 24, 1969; Newport Beach, California, United States
- Died: August 14, 2004 (aged 35); Dry Tortugas National Park, Florida, United States
- Occupation: Cinematographer

Neal Leslie Fredericks (July 24, 1969 – August 14, 2004) was an American cinematographer best known for the 1999 horror film The Blair Witch Project.

== Early life ==
Born in California, Fredericks grew up in Maryland, where he attended Montgomery College and graduated from Towson University in 1991.

== Career ==
He then moved to Florida, shooting films for students at the University of Central Florida. Fredericks met his partners on The Blair Witch Project at Central Florida and they filmed primarily in Maryland.

Fredericks's other credits include Dreamers, Killer Me, The Stonecutter, Erosion, The Burkittsville 7, and Abominable.

== Death ==
Fredericks died while filming scenes for the film CrossBones. A Cessna 206, the private aircraft he and the film's writer/director Daniel Zirilli were using to obtain aerial footage of Dry Tortugas National Park crashed into the sea when its engine failed. Though Zirilli, the pilot, and two other crew members were able to escape, Fredericks had tied himself into the airplane while he operated the camera. He was unable to free himself before the aircraft submerged and subsequently drowned.
