= T.I.'s Road to Redemption =

- Genre: Reality
- Starring: T.I.; Leigh Ann Crowley
- Country of origin: United States
- Original language: English
- No. of seasons: 1
- No. of episodes: 9

Production
- Executive producers: Billy Taylor; Brian Sher; Chris Choun; Clifford Joseph Harris Jr.; George McTeague; Jason Geter; Michael Hirschorn; Stella Stolper; Tony DiSanto; Queen Muhammad Ali
- Running time: 42 to 44 minutes
- Production companies: Category 5 Entertainment; Grand Hustle; Ish Entertainment

Original release
- Network: MTV
- Release: February 10 – April 7, 2009

Related
- T.I. & Tiny: The Family Hustle

T.I.'s Road to Redemption is an American reality television show that premiered on February 10, 2009, on MTV. The show was produced by T.I., Michael Hirschorn, Stella Stolper, and Chris Choun of Ish Entertainment. The series, focusing on the 45 days before rapper T.I.'s March sentencing, aimed to encourage teenagers to avoid spending a life of crime by showing seven teenagers a different path. In T.I.'s Road to Redemption, T.I. shares mistakes he has made and lessons he has learned. The show includes events in his personal life such as the birth of his sixth son and the release of his album, Paper Trail.

In 2007, T.I. was convicted of two felony gun charges. He served a sentence of one year and one day behind bars starting March 27, 2009. He was also sentenced to 1500 hours of community service. The series started filming in June 2008 and continued until March 2009.

"We visited T.I. early in 2008 while he was under house arrest in Georgia and found a man utterly unlike his rap persona," Stella Stolper and Michael Hirschorn of Ish Entertainment said. "He felt that he was undergoing a karmic reckoning, a time when he would have to balance the scales of his life and integrate who he was with who he is. We've never seen someone so introspective, so smart about how who he was back in the slums of Atlanta is affecting who he is now."

In the last days of filming, the show's star T.I. wrote a statement that was published in several news sites. In the statement "Responsibility Is a Lifestyle: It's Time to Bury Da Beef" T.I. reflected on bad decisions he had made, and thanked key figures for helping with the show and reducing his sentencing. "With many mentors and supporters by my side, including Rev. Al Sharpton, Russell Simmons, Kevin Liles, GlobalGrind.com, Political Swagger, Mobile Regime (Parent company of Nation19) and the C.H.A.N.G.E. Initiative to share the message that now is the time. Now is the time to speak out against gun violence. Now is the time to take responsibility for our actions. Now is the time to make our communities safer."

The title of the show was updated multiple times to reflect how many days were remaining before T.I.'s sentencing (i.e. T.I.'s Road to Redemption: 38 Days to Go, T.I.'s Road to Redemption: 31 Days to Go, T.I.'s Road to Redemption: 1 Day to Go etc.).

== Episodes ==
No.	Title	Original release date
1	"45 Days to Go: You Are Responsible for Your Own Actions"	February 10, 2009
2	"38 Days to Go: Own Your Mistakes"	February 17, 2009
3	"31 Days to Go: Your Environment Does Not Define You"	February 24, 2009
4	"24 Days to Go: You Have to Focus on the Positive"	March 3, 2009
5	"17 Days to Go: Reality Is Not Entertainment"	March 10, 2009
6	"11 Days to Go: Revenge Is Not the Answer"	March 17, 2009
7	"11 Days to Go: You Quit, You Lose"	March 17, 2009
8	"4 Days to Go"	March 24, 2009
9	"The Reckoning"	April 7, 2009
