= CrossBones (film) =

- Directed by: Daniel Zirilli
- Written by: Daniel Zirilli; D. Glase Lomond
- Produced by: Daniel Zirilli; Ann Luster; Melissa Strickland
- Starring: Joseph Marino; Mayra Soto; Hardy-Ames Hill; Jessie Camacho
- Cinematography: Neal Fredericks
- Edited by: Roger Cohen
- Music by: Nick Rivera, Tassho Pearce, Radio Bums (soundtrack only)
- Production companies: Pan Productions; Pop Art Film Factory
- Distributed by: Lions Gate Films
- Release date: August 30, 2005
- Running time: 88 minutes
- Country: United States
- Language: English

CrossBones is a 2005 American horror film about the curse of a deadly pirate being unleashed upon reality television contestants. The film was directed, co-written and co-produced by Daniel Zirilli. CrossBones was the last film to be photographed by cinematographer Neal Fredericks, who died in a plane accident while shooting aerial scenes for the film.

== Plot summary ==
A group of people decide to be a part of a reality television show based around a treasure hunt on an island. Whichever contestant is lucky wins the ultimate prize. Unbeknownst to the contestants, an ancient curse from the ghostly pirate Blackbeard exists on the island. They unwittingly unleash the curse which results in a bloodbath.

== Partial cast ==
- Joseph Marino as Blackbeard
- Mayra Soto as Serena
- Hardy-Ames Hill as Tony
- Jessie Camacho as Audra
- Joe Jones as Martin
- J. Shin as Greedy G.
- Merlynne Williams as Melissa
- Kevin Hawke as Scott
- Kristin Ellich as Tris
- John Sanzari as Gus

== Release ==
The DVD was released in Full Frame format with Dolby Digital 5.1 Surround and Dolby Digital 2.0 Surround audio formats for English viewing. There are English and Spanish subtitles. The special features are a photo gallery, a behind the scenes documentary, trailers for other Lion's Gate releases, and a commentary track.

== Reception ==
Mitchell Hattaway of DVD Verdict wrote a negative review that concluded with "Bottom line: Cross Bones blows." Jon Condit of Dread Central said that the film seems to be a mix of the worst pirate films ever made, but stated that "one must admire the filmmaker's faith and exuberance in his project". J. Read of Monsters At Play said that the film started out well enough, but turned into a clichéd film.
