= John Scurlock =

Mississippi politician

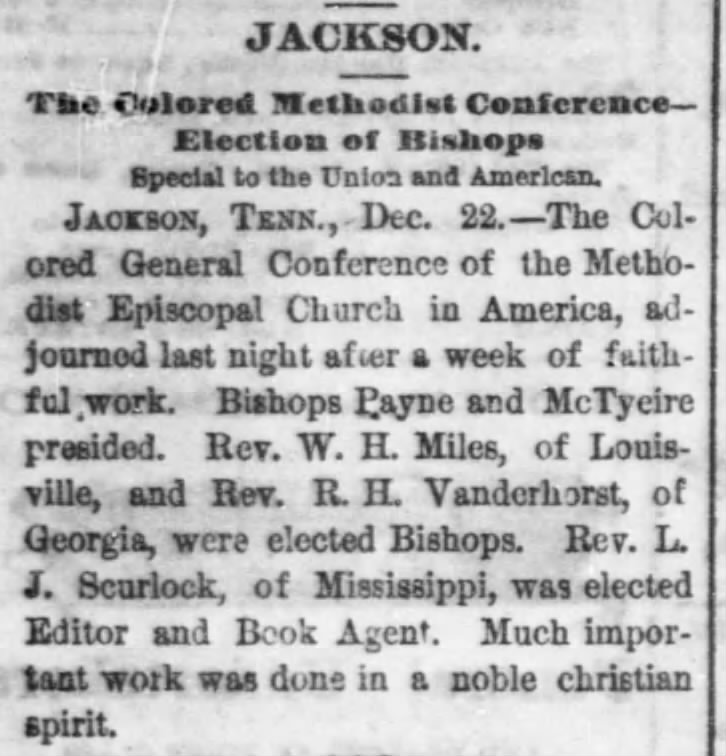
- "Jackson: The Colored Methodist Conference—Election of Bishops" (Nashville Union and American, December 23, 1870)
- Born: Mississippi
- Cause of death: Murder
- Era: Reconstruction
- Height: 7 ft 0 in (213 cm)

John Scurlock, known as Little John Scurlock or L. J. Scurlock (c. 1842 – December 28, 1890), was a Methodist minister, editor and politician in Mississippi, United States. He was reported to be seven feet tall. According to a history written during the nadir of American race relations era, "The negro leader, John Scurlock, was killed one night in Coffeeville by unknown parties. It was supposed that the deed was committed by the Ku Klux Klan, and little effort was made to find the murderers, as the negro was a very bad character." However although he is often classified as a Reconstruction-era murder victim, records of the Methodist Church in the south seem to have Rev. L. J. Scurlock into the 1880s or possibly 1890s. A history published 1895 states "Many who have been in attendance upon the sessions of the General Conference in recent years will remember the tall, courtly figure of a presiding elder from Mississippi, the Rev. L. J. Scurlock. A prominent worker on committees, thoughtful and dignified, he gained immediate attention whenever he obtained the floor in debate. For many years he occupied a leading position among the people of his own State, and in the Conference he exercised a commanding, yet gentle, influence. He has passed from the ranks of the Church militant to his place in the Church triumphant."

== Biography ==
Scurlock was born in Mississippi in about 1842 to parents born in Virginia. Scurlock was a member of the Coffeeville, Mississippi, Board of Aldermen and was an important leader in Yalobusha County's African American community. Per a history published 1912, "The board of aldermen always had at least two negroes on it. They were usually John Scurlock and Sidney Hoskins, both of whom had pretty good practical sense."

According to a newspaper report Scurlock was elected doorkeeper of the Mississippi Senate in 1872. According to a history of black lawmakers during Reconstruction he lost an election to serve in the state legislature in 1872. According to the 1912 history, "Frauds and intimidations were often perpetuated in the elections of the reconstruction period in order to keep the negroes from voting or to make their votes count for the Democrats," and various means of fraud, deception, or intimidation are described. The Civil War and Reconstruction Governors of Mississippi digital humanities project has a letter requesting the commutation of a death sentence that stated, "These papers were promptly forwarded to your Excellency by the hands of L. J. Scurlock, a colored man of some prominence among the people of his race in this county, who said to me that he did not think that Anderson ought to be hung and that he would do all he could for him." Apparently Governor Adelbert Ames did indeed reduce the man's sentence to life.

Scurlock served as a "Book Agent," and assistant editor of the Christian Index newspaper. In 1875 he was chair of the Yalobusha Republican Committee and a nominee for sheriff, and represented Yalobusha County at the Republican State Convention, where he sat on the committee on resolutions. In 1876, he became a trustee of Tougaloo College. In 1878 during the yellow fever epidemic, he served on a relief committee for "plague-stricken" towns in the region. Scurlock and his wife M. E. Scurlock were working as schoolteachers in Coffeeville in 1880.

In 1888 he was chairman of the Republican Congressional Committee for the 4th district where he also nominated for presidential elector. He also came to Little Rock, Arkansas to preach that year and was elected a trustee of Livingstone College in North Carolina.

In May 1890 Scurlock was nominated to be postmaster for Water Valley and the whites were mad: "Friday's paper contains the information that the name of L. J. Scurlock, colored, of Coffeeville, has been sent to the Senate for confirmation as postmaster at this place. It is impossible to express the indignation felt by our people when the report became current on the streets. It may be consistent with Northern ideas of right and courtesy to place colored men in authority over white men, women and children, but it is not so in the South, and the present administration is but writing its own doom with such acts. Water Valley Progress." In September 1890 a presidential nomination of L. J. Scurlock of Water Valley, Mississippi for something was withdrawn.

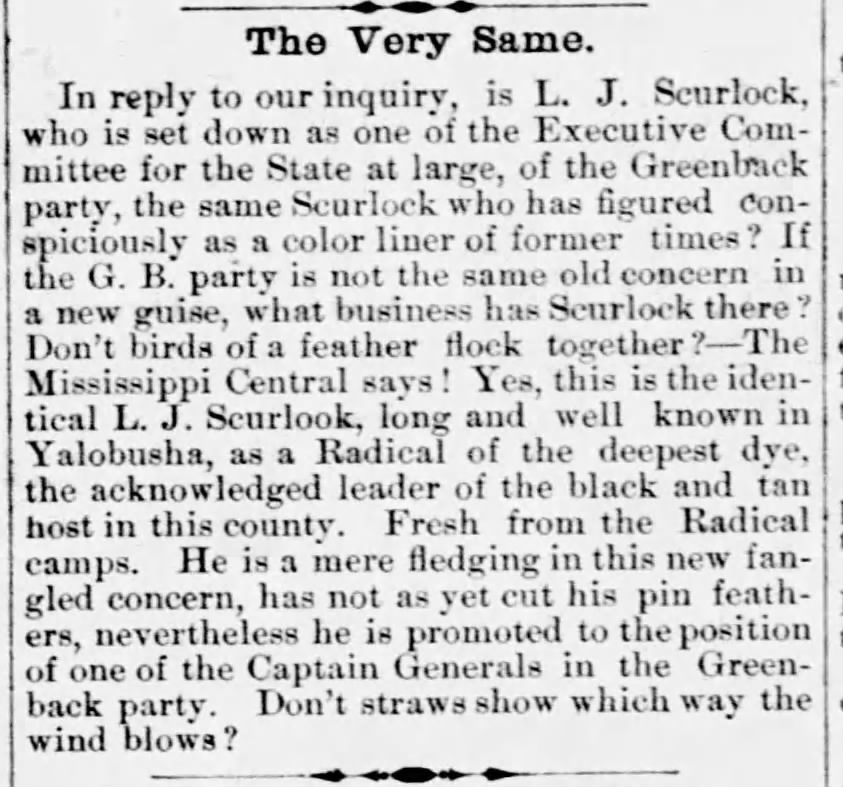
"The Very Same" The Clarion-Ledger, August 20, 1879

According to a white informant named Dr. T. F. Brown to historian Julia Brown in the first decade of the 20th century: "The negro who stirred up the most strife in Yalobusha county in the Reconstruction period was John Scurlock. He was a saddle-colored negro who, though born in slavery, he was the acknowledged son of a Yankee teacher who had plied his vocation in the county before the war. This negro, Scurlock, had received a smattering education and, being nearly white, was, of course, recognized as a leader of the race. Be it said to his credit, he had sense enough to recognize the inevitable superiority of the white men when he came in contact with them. His word was law with the negro race throughout the county. A few white renegades allied themselves with Scurlock and through him attempted to rule the people and fill the offices. Whenever they wanted a meeting they simply asked Scurlock to 'call the clans' and it was done. Scurlock was a very tall negro, about seven feet high. He was generally known as 'Little John Scurlock.'"

There is one reference to Scurlock in The Negro in Mississippi, 1865–1890 (published 1947): "Among the leaders of this Negro denomination in Mississippi were J. H. Anderson, L. J. Scurlock, R. Polk, and Elias Cottrell, who, after his removal to Tennessee, became a bishop. Although Scurlock's political activity caused him to be hanged by the Klan, most of the leaders and members of this church were inclined to be quiet and conservative."

== See also ==
- Lynching of Frazier B. Baker and Julia Baker – 1898 South Carolina killing of a black postmaster
- Minnie M. Cox - black postmaster threatened with lynching in Indianola, Mississippi, 1903
- African American officeholders from the end of the Civil War until before 1900
