= OopDeeWopDee =

Single by NSS16
- Released: April 20, 2004
- Recorded: 2002
- Genre: R&B, hip hop
- Length: 3:49
- Label: Universal Music, Casablanca Records
- Songwriter(s): Greg Lawson, Mike Anthony, Hakeem Khaaliq, David Banner (uncredited), Aloe Blacc (uncredited)
- Producer(s): Greg Lawson (Producer), Hakeem Khaaliq(co-producer), Ric Wake (exec.)

NSS16 singles chronology
"OopDeeWopDee"	"OopDeeWopDee (Remix)"

"OopDeeWopDee" is a hip hop, R&B, and soul song by Casablanca Records recording group NSS16. The song features Universal Records David Banner and Aloe Blacc. Released on April 20, 2004, the song was written by Greg Lawson, Mike Anthony, and multi-media activist Hakeem Khaaliq who served as the co-producer, music video treatment writer and Music video director for the single. Lyrically, the song is a young woman's plea to stay virtuous. Due to internal problems between management and the group never toured.

In Billboard Magazine, the remix featuring David Banner peaked at #49 on the Hot R&B/Hip-Hop Singles Sales, which ranks sales of physical singles.

== Music video ==
The music video for "OopDeeWopDee" shows the group in an all women prison with Tommy Mottola as the Warden. Cameo appearances include, Game, The Pharcyde, Kam, Crooked I, Spitfiya and Bokeem Woodbine. Comic relief was provided by BET comic view comedian Glenn Peoples who played the prison's security. Filmed entirely on location in California. David Banner breaks the girls out of prison to attend a party.
