= Eddy C. Scurlock =

- Born: January 13, 1905; Bronson, Texas, USA
- Died: January 17, 1988 (aged 83); Houston, Texas, USA
- Occupation: Business

Eddy Clark Scurlock (January 13, 1905 – January 17, 1988) was an American oil industry tycoon, entrepreneur, millionaire, and philanthropist, who founded the Scurlock Oil Company; the Eddy Refining Company; and the charitable organization Scurlock Foundation in Houston, Texas.

== Early life ==
He was born in Bronson, Texas, the son of Robert William Scurlock (January 5, 1862–May 9, 1950) and Ella Octavia Clark (September 13, 1877–February 12, 1970). He had four siblings: Winona Scurlock (1902–1990), Willie Faye Scurlock (1907–1971), Juanita Clark Scurlock (1909–1985), and Werter Chappell Scurlock (1911–1985).

He grew up in the small town of Tenaha. After high school, he went to work at a Standard Oil pipeline construction site as a kitchen assistant. He later moved to Houston, where he bought a gas station.

== Career ==
Scurlock began to work in the oil industry through his employment at a Standard Oil pipeline construction site. His job was a kitchen assistant. He later relocated to Houston, where he bought a gas station. In 1936, Scurlock borrowed money and formed Scurlock Oil Company. A decade later, he bought a Houston refinery and renamed it Eddy Refining Company. His wife was Elizabeth Belschner (March 12, 1904–June 9, 2003), daughter of Andrew Belschner and Martha Quinn. They had one daughter, Laura Lee Scurlock (June 4, 1928–August 6, 1999). Laura married Jack Blanton, who became a Scurlock Oil and Eddy Refinery executive.

Scurlock established and chartered the charitable Scurlock Foundation in April 1954, with the goal to provide funding for medical research, health care, religion, education, recreation, the arts, and animal protection. Other founding members were their daughter, Laura L. Scurlock Blanton, and son-in-law, Jack S. Blanton, who became president of Scurlock Oil Company in 1958. In 1992, it reported assets of over $9 million and an income of over $750,000. There were 122 grants made for a total of $604,720, mostly to art museums and art associations. In 2015, it provided support for an exhibition showcasing a medieval illuminated manuscript and related artifacts at the Blanton Museum of Art at The University of Texas at Austin.

He was a chairman of St. Luke's United Methodist Church, an advisory director of Texas Commerce Bank, and a director of Lon Morris College and Texas Medical Center. Scurlock also benefited the Methodist Hospital System and the Institute of Religion in Houston.

== Later years ==
In 1982, Scurlock Oil Company was sold to Ashland Oil. Eddy Refining Company and the Scurlock Foundation continue operations.

Eddy C. Scurlock died at age 83 in Houston.
