= Hakeem Khaaliq =

American cinematographer, film director, and producer

- Born: Los Angeles, California, U.S.
- Occupations: Film director; Cinematographer; Film producer; Photographer
- Years active: 1995–present
- Notable work: Bigg Snoop Dogg: Raw 'N Uncut, #Bars4Justice, Comin' Up Short, ¿Quiénes son los afro-mexicanos?, Invisible México: Afro-Mexicanos, War on Us
- Relatives: Addison N. Scurlock (great-uncle)

Hakeem Khaaliq (also Hakeem Abdul-Khaaliq) is an American cinematographer, film director, producer, and photographer known for his work in documentary filmmaking, visual anthropology, and photography. He began his career in the 1990s as a music producer with Radio Bums before transitioning to film, directing his first documentary, Bigg Snoop Dogg: Raw 'N Uncut, in 2003. His later works include the short film #Bars4Justice (2015), the feature documentary Comin' Up Short (2023), and the television short *¿Quiénes son los afro-mexicanos?* (2014). In 2010, he co-founded Nation19 magazine with Queen Muhammad Ali, focusing on photojournalism and social issues. Khaaliq is also recognized for his photographic exhibit *Invisible México*, which used augmented reality (AR) technology, and his documentary *War on Us* (2016), which addressed social justice issues.

== Early life and career ==
Hakeem Khaaliq was born and raised in South Central, Los Angeles, California. His father was a stuntman who worked on films such as The Spook Who Sat by the Door (1973), exposing Khaaliq to the entertainment industry from an early age. He is the great-nephew of Addison N. Scurlock, an American photographer known for documenting Black life in Washington, D.C.

In 1995, Khaaliq founded Radio Bums, a music production and publishing company, working with hip-hop artists on the West Coast. He shifted to filmmaking in the early 2000s, directing Bigg Snoop Dogg: Raw 'N Uncut (2003), a documentary featuring Snoop Dogg and Sean Combs.

== Filmography ==
Year	Film and television	Director	Producer	Writer	Editor	Music Publishing	Notes			
Year	Film and television	2003	Bigg Snoop Dogg: Raw 'N Uncut	Yes	Yes	Yes	Notes	Yes	Yes	Documentary film featuring Sean 'Diddy' Combs, Warren G, Bishop Don Magic Juan
2005	The Tale of Timmy Two Chins	No	No	No	No	Yes	Showtime short film			
2005	Beauty Shop	No	No	No	No	Yes	Feature film for MGM			
2007	Adventures in Hollyhood	No	No	No	No	Yes	Reality TV series for MTV			
2008	T.I.'s Road to Redemption	No	Yes	No	No	No	Reality TV series for MTV			
2010	Tha Bizness	Yes	Yes	Yes	Yes	Yes	Documentary short			
2013	Judge Lauren Lake's Paternity Court	No	Yes	No	No	No	TV series for MGM Television			
2014	¿Quiénes son los afro-mexicanos?	No	Yes	No	No	No	TV short; aired on Univision			
2015	#Bars4Justice	Yes	Yes	Yes	Yes	Yes	Short film screened at MoMA, Pan African Film Festival (Best Short Documentary winner), Glasgow Short Film Festival, Arizona State University, Tirana International Film Festival, Milwaukee Film Festival			
2016	War on Us	Yes	Yes	Yes	Yes	Yes	Short film screened at the United Nations General Assembly Special Session (UNGASS) 2016; featured Rhymefest			
2016	The Last Matai	Yes	Yes	Yes	Yes	Yes	Documentary			
2023	Comin' Up Short	Yes	Yes	Yes	Yes	No	Feature documentary screened at Pan African Film Festival, British Film Institute, BFI Southbank (December 14, 2023, with BFI Inclusion)			

== Photographic Work and Exhibitions ==
Khaaliq's photographic work includes *Invisible México: Afro-Mexicanos*, an exhibit co-created with Queen Muhammad Ali that debuted in 2017 at the monOrchid gallery in Phoenix. The exhibit, which used augmented reality (AR) technology, was recognized as the first AR exhibit in Phoenix and focused on showcasing Afro-Mexican culture through Khaaliq's photography. The opening reception was hosted by Phoenix Mayor Greg Stanton. In 2017, it was named “Best of the Best” by the Arizona Commission on the Arts and toured nationally, with coverage in publications like Nashville Scene and Your Valley.

== Collaborations and Music ==
Khaaliq collaborated with hip-hop artists Jasiri X and Rhymefest, along with Queen Muhammad Ali, on the 2016 short film *War on Us*, which addressed social justice issues such as the war on drugs and police brutality. The film was screened at the United Nations General Assembly Special Session (UNGASS) in 2016 and featured in an article on Sankofa.org, highlighting its activism and cultural significance. This project built on Khaaliq's earlier work, such as *#Bars4Justice*, in documenting hip-hop activism.

== Recognition ==
Khaaliq's short film #Bars4Justice, co-directed with Queen Muhammad Ali, was screened at the Museum of Modern Art (MoMA) during Doc Fortnight 2017, as well as the Glasgow Short Film Festival, Arizona State University, Tirana International Film Festival, and Milwaukee Film Festival. It won Best Short Documentary at the 24th Pan African Film Festival and the Audience Choice Award for Best Short Film at the Uptown Short Film Festival, and has been reviewed for educational use in university settings. His feature documentary Comin' Up Short premiered at the Pan African Film Festival in 2021, was screened at the British Film Institute, and had an exclusive screening at BFI Southbank in London on December 14, 2023, in partnership with BFI Inclusion.
