= Plains All American Pipeline =

Midstream oil and gas company

Plains All American Pipeline, L.P.
- Type: Public
- Traded as: Nasdaq: PAA; Nasdaq: PAGP
- Industry: Petroleum industry
- Founded: 1981; 45 years ago
- Headquarters: Houston, Texas, United States
- Key people: Willie Chiang (chairman and CEO)
- Services: Pipeline transport Oil terminal
- Revenue: ▲$57.342 billion (2022)
- Net income: ▲$1,037 billion (2022)
- Total assets: ▼$23.892 billion (2022)
- Total equity: ▲$13.325 billion (2022)
- Website: www.plains.com

Plains (also known as "Plains All American Pipeline, L.P." and "Plains GP Holdings") is a master limited partnership engaged in pipeline transport, marketing, and storage of liquefied petroleum gas and petroleum in the United States and Canada. Plains owns interests in 18,370 miles (29,560 km) of pipelines, storage capacity for about 75 million barrels of crude oil, 28 million barrels of NGLs, 68 billion cubic feet of natural gas, and 5 natural gas processing plants. The company is headquartered in the Allen Center in Downtown Houston, Texas. Plains (NASDAQ: PAA) is a publicly traded Master limited partnership. PAA owns an extensive network of pipeline transportation, terminalling, storage and gathering assets in key crude oil and NGL producing basins and transportation corridors at major market hubs in the United States and Canada.

== History ==
The company began in 1981 as a small oil and gas exploration and production company called Plains Resources. It became a publicly traded company via an initial public offering in 1998.

Major acquisitions include:

- 1998 - All American Pipeline System
- 1999 - Scurlock Oil Company Permian and west Texas pipeline from Chevron Corporation for $35 million
- 2001 - Midstream operations of Murphy Oil for $155 million
- 2001 - CANPET Energy Group, a liquified gas marketing company based in Canada, for $42 million
- 2004 - Capline Pipeline System
- 2004 - Link Energy pipeline system for $273 million
- 2005 - Assets in Louisiana from Shell Oil Company for $12 million
- 2006 - Pacific Energy Partners for $2.4 billion
- 2008 - Rainbow oil pipeline in Northern Alberta
- 2012 - Canadian NGL business from BP
- 2017 - Alpha Crude Connector gathering system and pipeline in the Permian Basin for $1.2 billion.
- 2019- The Cactus II Pipeline System enters service, capable of transporting 670,000 barrels of crude oil per day from Wink, Texas to Corpus Christi.
- 2021- Plains Oryx Permian Basin, a joint venture between Plains and Oryx Midstream Services, is formed. The combined system includes ~5,500 miles of pipeline, ~6.8 million barrels per day of pipeline capacity, and ~16.9 million barrels operational storage capacity.
- 2025 - Diamondback Energy, Inc and Kinetik Holdings Inc. - operators of the EPIC Crude Oil Pipeline.

== Financial performance and credit ratings ==
The company earned a profit in nine of the ten calendar years from 2013 to 2022. It reported a $2.59 billion loss for calendar year 2020. Management attributed the 2020 loss to the COVID-19 global pandemic, which reduced demand for energy products. In response, the company recorded goodwill impairment losses and non-cash impairment charges of some $3.4 billion in 2020.

Net Income (Loss)
Year	$ billions
2013	$1.39
2014	$1.39
2015	$0.90
2016	$0.73
2017	$0.86
2018	$2.21
2019	$2.17
2020	($2.59)
2021	$0.59
2022	$1.03

As of August 2023, Plains All American's senior unsecured debt was rated Baa3 by Moody's Investors Service, and BBB− by Fitch Ratings and S&P Global Ratings. All three ratings are generally considered "investment grade."

== Carbon footprint ==
Plains All American Pipeline reported Total CO2e emissions (Direct + Indirect) for the twelve months ending 31 December 2020 at 1,929 Kt (-290 /-13.1% y-o-y).

Plains All American Pipeline's annual Total CO2e Emissions - Location-Based Scope 1 + Scope 2 (in kilotonnes)
Dec 2018	Dec 2019	Dec 2020
2,367	2,219	1,929

== Controversies ==
=== 2010 settlement ===
In 2010, the company agreed to pay a $3.25 million civil penalty for violating the Clean Water Act and to spend $41 million to upgrade more than 10,000 miles of crude oil pipelines after the United States Environmental Protection Agency pressed charges regarding 10 pipeline spills in Texas, Louisiana, Oklahoma, and Kansas between June 2004 and September 2007 that spilled over 273,000 gallons of crude oil, some of which ended up in rivers, lakes, and oceans.

=== Little Buffalo oil spill ===
The 2011 Little Buffalo oil spill was one of the largest land-based oil spills in North America, the largest oil spill in Alberta in 36 years, and the second spill in Alberta within a two-week period. The Rainbow Pipeline system, owned by Plains Midstream Canada, ruptured on April 29, 2011, spilling 28,000 barrels of oil in a fairly isolated stretch of boreal forest in northern Alberta, about four miles from the nearest homes in Little Buffalo, Alberta. The local school was closed due to concerns about the effects of fumes. The incident resulted in charges against the company in 2013. In 2013, the Energy Resources Conservation Board of Alberta reprimanded the company for operational failures in connection with the oil spill.

=== Rangeland Pipeline Incident ===
Heavy rains in early June 2012 caused a leak on a 46-year-old Plains Midstream Canada pipeline at Jackson Creek, Alberta, a tributary of the Red Deer River, which spilled approximately 1,000-3,000 barrels of light sour crude into the Red Deer River. The company was charged in 2014.

=== Refugio oil spill ===
On May 19, 2015, a pipeline operated by the company ruptured northwest of Santa Barbara, California. Within 24 hours, oil polluted approximately 9 miles of the Santa Barbara coast. The spill shut down the popular El Capitán State Beach and Campground during Memorial Day weekend, just prior to the beginning of the summer high season. The spill leaked 105,000 US gallons (2,500 bbl), including 20,000 US gallons (480 bbl) that reached the Pacific Ocean. The United States House Committee on Energy and Commerce opened an investigation into the oil spill on June 25, 2015. Companies are required to report to the National Response Center on the release of hazardous-material "at the earliest practicable moment."; however, the company did not initially report the spill. According to preliminary findings of the federal Pipeline and Hazardous Materials Safety Administration released in June 2015, corrosion had worn a pipeline section to less than an inch thick. By June 2015 the cost of cleanup rose to USD$92 million. Santa Barbara County firefighters were among the first to discover the spill, before being notified by the company, and they "built a rim of rocks to prevent oil from running to the shoreline." In March 2020, the company agreed to pay over $60 million in penalties related to the incident.

=== Byhalia Connection pipeline ===
In December 2019, the company announced a joint venture with Valero Energy Corp. to build the Byhalia Connection pipeline – a crude oil pipeline system that would run 49 miles from Memphis to Marshall County, Mississippi, and connect two existing crude oil pipelines: the Diamond pipeline and the Capline pipeline. Concerns over the pipeline's route through the Memphis Sand aquifer, as well as the city's predominantly Black neighborhoods, sparked an opposition movement. The struggle to stop the pipeline gained widespread attention, with environmental and social justice advocates like Jane Fonda and Danny Glover lending their support. Former Vice-President Al Gore called the pipeline a “reckless, racist rip-off,” and U.S. Rep. Steve Cohen asked President Joe Biden to consider revoking the project's federal permit. After defending the pipeline and then putting its planned construction on hold in May 2021, the company announced on July 2, 2021 that it was abandoning the project. Community leader Justin J. Pearson called the pipeline’s cancellation an “extraordinary testament to what Memphis and Shelby County can do when citizens build power toward justice.”
