= Diamond Pipeline =

Oil pipeline system in the United States

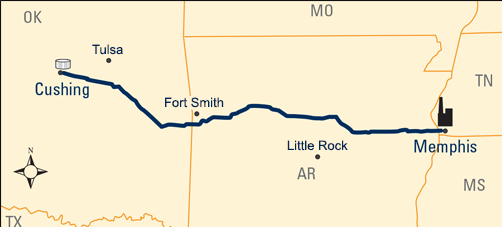
- Diamond Pipeline Route

Location
- Country: United States

General information
- Type: Crude oil
- Owner: Plains All American Pipeline; Valero

The Diamond Pipeline is an oil pipeline system that runs from Cushing, Oklahoma, to Memphis, Tennessee, in the United States. In 2016, the engineering plans, permits, and construction will commence, anticipating to finish construction of the pipeline in 2017. According to the U.S. Army Corps of Engineers, the pipeline will cross approximately 500 bodies of water including streams and rivers. The pipeline will also cross approximately 11 drinking water sources.
