= Adventures in Hollyhood =

- Genre: Reality
- Starring: Juicy J DJ Paul; Project Pat; Big Triece; Computer
- Narrated by: Father Houston
- Theme music composer: Three 6 Mafia
- Opening theme: "Adventures in Hollyhood"
- Composers: Radio Bums, Queen Muhammad Ali, Masaniai Muhammad Ali,, Gilde Flores
- Country of origin: United States
- Original language: English
- No. of seasons: 1
- No. of episodes: 8

Production
- Producers: Paul Vaillancourt; Ashton Kutcher
- Production locations: Los Angeles, California; Memphis, Tennessee
- Running time: 24 minutes
- Production companies: Katalyst Films; TollboothTV; Hypnotize Minds; MTV Series Entertainment

Original release
- Network: MTV
- Release: April 5 – May 23, 2007

Adventures in Hollyhood is a reality television series about the rap group Three 6 Mafia and its members Juicy J and DJ Paul. The show primarily takes place at a Hollywood Hills home that the pair resides in along with Hypnotize Minds artist Project Pat (who is also Juicy J's brother) and their personal assistants Computer and Big Triece. It premiered on April 5, 2007, on MTV.

== Episodes ==
No.	Title	Original release date
1	"Welcome To Hollyhood (Hello To Hollyhood)"	April 5, 2007
Three 6 Mafia, Project Pat, and their assistants Computer and Patriece (Big Triece) move to Hollywood, California. They write a song for Jackass Number Two called "Goin' Crazy" which they had to change its title to "Gettin' Fucked Up" due to the Jackass cast feeling the title "Goin' Crazy" is "too on the nose" and "takes a spud on what they do". Next, they have a listening party for the neighborhood but only one person shows up. They play "Slob on My Knob", "Ridin' Spinners", "Side 2 Side", "Good Googly Moogly" "Squeeze It" and some other songs to their only guest, an older white lady named Fern.
2	"Slap That Sucka (Rap Stars R Us)"	April 12, 2007
The guys get kicked out of their house because Big Triece urinated in Jennifer Love Hewitt's yard, and have to find a new place. Lil Wyte comes out to Hollywood to go on a showcase for Warner Bros. Records. Meanwhile, Big Triece and Computer mess with Lil Wyte and try to pitch songs to DJ Paul and Juicy J, so they can become rappers; both DJ Paul and Juicy J hate their songs.
3	"Makin' A Gangsta' Ass Movie (Pitchin Fits)"	April 19, 2007
DJ Paul and Juicy J pitch their movie idea, while Computer and Triece are sent to assistant school.
4	"Sweet Sugar Love (Lovin' Large)"	April 26, 2007
Big Triece begins to get serious with his girlfriend, Sugarfoot (died Septemmber 2021), and proposes to her via cellphone, where Sugarfoot agrees. Later, Three 6 Mafia help Triece buy a ring, while at the same time booking Sugarfoot to come to LA to surprise Triece with a big dinner in a Beverly Hills restaurant. After the dinner, and possibly a week in LA, Sugarfoot returns to her hometown, probably postponing their marriage.
5	"Little Black Book"	May 2, 2007
Ashton Kutcher helps Juicy search the Hollywood dating scene. He promises to give Juice his sidekick with many celebrities' phone numbers in them if he asks Ashton's assistant Chrissie out on a date. Elsewhere Computer goes to major lengths to try to win a weight loss contest between himself, Triece and Pat. He defeats them and wins five thousand dollars. After going on a date with Chrissie, Juicy J receives the sidekick and decides to take Kristin Cavallari on a date. She agrees, but when he asks her to go back home with him for a party, she tells him "no".
6	"Actin' Up"	May 9, 2007
Juicy J figures out that Hollywood is there for him to be an actor in the movies. He goes to a movie casting to try to meet with the director of the movie. First he fails, but the casting lady gives him a second chance. He goes back to talk to the director, who tells him that he will use him as an actor later on. At the end of the show the guys receive a package with dolls of Juicy J, DJ Paul, and heads of Project Pat, Computer and Triece.
7	"The Playa's Mansion"	May 16, 2007
Juicy J's dad calls him and tells him not to get too caught up in the Hollywood life and tells him to do some community service.
8	"Going Back 2 Memphis"	May 23, 2007
In the season finale, the guys return to Memphis for some inspiration for their album, and struggle to write the single. The writing and recording of "Doe Boy Fresh" can be seen.

== Guest appearances ==
Some of the recurring guests throughout the Hollyhood season are: Memphis rapper and H.C.P. artist Lil Wyte; the boys' newfound friend and former pianist for Dorothy Dandridge, Fern; and Three 6 Mafia's manager Rosenberg also referred to as Roses.

Other guests include:
Lil Jon
Hugh Hefner
Kristin Cavallari
John Singleton
Ashton Kutcher
Johnny Knoxville
Lil Wyte
Scott Sedita
Joel Schumacher
Father Houston (Juicy J & Project Pat's dad)
