= The Negro in Mississippi =

Book by Vernon Lane Wharton

The Negro in Mississippi is a book by Vernon Lane Wharton. Many editions were published. Carter G. Woodson reviewed the book in The Journal of Negro History. In Susquehanna University professor William A. Russ Jr.'s review for The Journal of Southern History, he stated "This valuable and well-written book deserves to be read by all students of southern history and by all who are interested in race relations."

Harper & Row published it in 1965. The University of North Carolina republished it in 2018.
