= Queen Muhammad Ali =

American film director

- Born: Queen Melé Le'iato Tuiasosopo Muhammad Ali; November 12; Watts, Los Angeles, California, U.S.
- Occupations: Director; producer; writer; lecturer; journalist; activist; model
- Website: queenmuhammadali.com

Queen Melé Le'iato Tuiasosopo Muhammad Ali (born November 12) is an American filmmaker, composer, social activist and visual anthropologist. Queen and her husband Hakeem Khaaliq founded Nation19, a magazine and film production company, and she is the director of the Manuia Samoa, a social wellness hub in American Samoa.

== Early life ==
Queen was born in Watts, Los Angeles, California, to an American Samoan mother who worked as a teacher, and an African American father who worked as a percussionist and singer and toured the Caribbean. After graduating high school at an early age, she attended Mt. San Jacinto College in Riverside County, where she studied art. Her grandmother, Princess Masaniai Tunufa'i Le'iato Tuiasosopo, is the daughter of Tuli Leʻiato, a Faʻamatai paramount chief of the islands of Tutuila and Aunu'u. From 1999 to 2007, part of which coincided with her time in college, Queen worked as a teacher at a private elementary school.

== Career ==
Queen was a composer on the MTV reality show Adventures in Hollyhood, starring rap group Three 6 Mafia, which premiered on April 5, 2007. Queen and Hakeem Khaaliq were consulting producers on the MTV reality show T.I.'s Road to Redemption, starring rapper T.I., which premiered on February 21, 2009. In the winter of 2010, the couple established Nation19, first as a printed magazine and artist collective before expanding into visiting lectures, photography exhibitions and film production with emphases on ethnography and hip hop culture.

In 2014, the couple produced ¿Quiénes son los afro-mexicanos? (Who are the Afro-Mexicans?), a two-part documentary short film that aired across Univision stations, premiering on July 14 and July 15 on KTVW. It also aired as a combined one-part short film in some markets.

In 2015, the couple produced and directed the documentary short film #Bars4Justice which had its premiere on October 1 in Phoenix, Arizona. The film was shot on August 9 in Ferguson, Missouri, documenting the first anniversary of the police shooting and killing of Michael Brown. It screened across film festivals internationally, including the 24th Pan African Film Festival in Los Angeles in February 2016 and the Museum of Modern Art's 17th Doc Fortnight film festival in Manhattan, New York in February 2017.

In 2016, the couple produced and directed the documentary short film War on Us, starring Rhymefest and Jasiri X in Bogota, Colombia, which had its premiere on April 19. The film highlights the negative consequences of the war on drugs and was screened at the Museum of Drug Policy's pop-up exhibition held in Manhattan, New York on April 19–21 coinciding with the Special Session of the United Nations General Assembly (UNGASS) that discussed the "world drug problem" and policies around it.

== Activism ==
Queen was an organizer and speaker at the Indigenous Peoples March held in Washington, DC on January 18, 2019, where she highlighted the health issues faced by American Samoa and Pacific Islanders, and was a speaker at the first Indigenous Peoples Movement conference held in Houston, Texas on May 10–12. She was a speaker on the December 21, 2020 virtual session of the Inter-Generational Dialogue (IGD) organized by Global Peace, an initiative of ACCORD (African Centre for the Constructive Resolution of Disputes) based in Mount Edgecombe, South Africa. The IGD was a part of the Global Conversation initiative launched by the United Nations in January 2020 to mark the body's 75th anniversary.

On February 2, 2021, Queen was selected by the Yerba Buena Center for the Arts in San Francisco as part of its YBCA 100 honoring a hundred "everyday heroes—artists, activists, and community leaders—whose work is in service of building sustainable, equitable, and regenerative communities" held virtually at the YBCA 100 Summit on April 3. On February 25, 2023, she received the Acie J. Belton Life Achievement Award in Baton Rouge, Louisiana.

== Personal life ==
Queen Muhammad Ali and Hakeem Khaaliq have three children.

== Works ==
=== Filmography ===
Year	Film and television	Director	Producer	Writer	Editor or Composer	Notes			
Year	Film and television	2007	Adventures in Hollyhood	No	No	Notes	No	Composer	Reality TV series
2008	T.I.'s Road to Redemption	No	Yes	No	No	Reality TV series			
2014	¿Quiénes son los afro-mexicanos?	No	Yes	No	No	TV short film			
2015	#Bars4Justice	Yes	Yes	Yes	Editor	Short film			
2016	War on Us	Yes	Yes	Yes	No	Short film			
2016	The Last Matai	Yes	No	No	Editor				
2022	Comin' Up Short	Yes	Yes	No	Composer				

=== Educational exhibits and installations ===
- Invisible México: Afro-Mexicanos Arizona Community Foundation (The Karen Work Seleznow Gallery)
- Invisible Mexico: Global Education Center Nashville, Tennessee September 2017
- A New New Wave!: monOrchid Gallery Phoenix Arizona
- Invisible Mexico: monOrchid Gallery Phoenix Arizona March 2017
- Exhibit19: February 2015 Glendale Community College
- Invisible Mexico: Private Gallery Univision Television April – July 2014
- #TURNUP Denver: DVSN WEST Cherry Creek Denver CO 2014

=== Design and multimedia ===
Michael Jackson commissioned Queen and her partner Hakeem Khaaliq to design for his This Is It concerts. The work included the design of the Earth Song website, design of MichaelJacksonCO.com website, print campaigns and the design of the Earth Song logo.
