= Scurlock Oil Company =

American oil company

The Scurlock Oil Company was an American oil company, with headquarters located in Houston, Texas.

== History ==
Founded in 1936 by Eddy C. Scurlock, the company was a tank car marketer of petroleum products. The company expanded in 1946 after it purchased a small refinery in Houston, which became the Eddy Refining Company. Scurlock eventually emerged as an important transporter of crude oil and natural-gas condensate.

By 1982, the Scurlock Oil Company was transporting 200,000 barrels (32,000 m^{3}) of oil a day by truck, barge, or pipeline.

Also in 1982, the Scurlock Oil Company was sold to Ashland Oil. When Ashland bought the Permian Corporation in 1991, it merged with Scurlock to form a subsidiary known as Scurlock Permian Corporation.

The Scurlock Permian Corporation subsidiary was sold to Plains All American Pipeline in 1999.
