= Bars4Justice =

1. Bars4Justice
- Theatrical film poster
- Directed by: Queen Muhammad Ali; Hakeem Khaaliq
- Written by: Queen Muhammad Ali; Hakeem Khaaliq
- Produced by: Nation19; Steve Muhammad-EL; Ronald Sims
- Starring: Common; Jasiri X Talib Kweli
- Cinematography: Hakeem Khaaliq
- Edited by: Queen Muhammad Ali; Hakeem Khaaliq
- Music by: Masaniai Muhammad Ali; Jorge Mendez; Jahsua (Hook Man); Radio Bums
- Release date: October 1, 2015
- Running time: 9 minutes
- Country: United States
- Language: English

Bars4Justice (also #Bars4Justice) is a 2015 American short documentary film directed by Samoan filmmaker Queen Muhammad Ali and Hakeem Khaaliq. The film was recorded in Ferguson, Missouri during the first anniversary of the shooting of Michael Brown on August 9–10, 2015. The film is an official selection of several international festivals including winning Best Short documentary at the 24th annual Pan African Film Festival in Los Angeles, Glasgow Short Film Festival in Scotland, Tirana International Film Festival (DOCUTIFF) in Albania, and The Museum of Modern Art (MoMA) in midtown Manhattan NY.

== Cast ==
- Common – Himself
- Talib Kweli – Himself
- Cornel West – Himself
- Jasiri X – Himself
- Renita Lamkin – Herself
- Rahiel Tesfamariam – Herself
- Rabbi Susan Talve – herself

== Accolades ==
List of awards, nominations and selections
Award	Date	Category	Recipients and nominees	Result
24th Annual Pan African Film Festival(PAFF) Los Angeles, CA	February 14, 2016	Best Short Documentary	Queen Muhammad Ali & Hakeem Khaaliq	Won
1st Annual Uptown Short Film Festival (USFF) Harlem, NY	May 15, 2016	Best Short Film (Audience Choice Award)	Queen Muhammad Ali & Hakeem Khaaliq	Won
Documentary Tirana International Film Festival (DocuTIFF) Tirana, Albania	June 1–8, 2016	Best Short Film Competition (Special Mention)	Queen Muhammad Ali & Hakeem Khaaliq	Nominated
Milwaukee Film Festival ()	September 22 – October 6, 2016	Short Film	Queen Muhammad Ali & Hakeem Khaaliq	Nominated
Mutianyu China ()	September 1–21, 2016	International Artist Fellowship and Residency Award	Queen Muhammad Ali & Hakeem Khaaliq	Won
MOMA (The Museum of Modern Art, NYC) ()	February 17 – 18 2017	Doc Fortnight 2017: MoMA's International Festival of Nonfiction Film and Media	Queen Muhammad Ali & Hakeem Khaaliq	Selected
Glasgow Short Film Festival, Glasgow, Scotland ()	March 17, 2018	GSFF18: the largest competitive short film festival in Scotland	Queen Muhammad Ali & Hakeem Khaaliq	Special Screening
