= Herbert Clay Scurlock =

American biochemist (1875–1952)

- Born: March 11, 1875; Fayetteville, North Carolina, United States
- Died: September 26, 1952 (aged 77); Washington, D.C., US
- Education: Livingstone College; Howard University; Columbia University
- Occupation: biochemist
- Employer: Howard University
- Known for: Pioneer in the use of radiation therapy on the treatment of cancer and in the use of X-rays for dental diagnosis
- Spouse: Mabel S. Scurlock
- Children: 5

Herbert Clay Scurlock (March 11, 1875 – September 26, 1952) was an American biochemist and a pioneer in the application of radiation therapy for treating cancer and the use of X-rays for dental diagnosis.

== Life ==
Scurlock was born in Fayetteville, North Carolina, in 1875. In 1895, he graduated in chemistry at Livingstone College. In 1900, he got a degree in medicine from Howard University, and a master of arts from Columbia University, in 1915.

From 1900 to 1905, Scurlock worked as an assistant in chemistry and lecturer in electrotherapy and X-ray at Howard University College of Medicine. He taught chemistry and physics for a brief stint, returning later to the College of Medicine as full professor of the department of physiological chemistry.

He was a member of the Medico-Chirurgical Society of the District of Columbia, and even its president in 1916. He was also a member of the American Chemical Society, the American Association for the Advancement of Science and the National Medical Association.

== Death ==
After two years of struggling with an illness, Scurlock died on September 26, 1952, in Washington D.C., at 77 years old, having worked for 40 years at Howard University. Herbert and his wife, Mabel S. Scurlock, had a son, Herbert S. Scurlock, and four daughters, Dorothea Dedmon, Helen Brown, Nina E. Mundy and Mabel E. Lewis.
