= Nation19 =

US magazine

Nation19 Magazine/APDTA
- Editor-in-chief: Queen Muhammad Ali, Hakeem Khaaliq
- Categories: Lifestyle magazine
- Frequency: Seasonal
- Founded: Winter 2010
- Company: Nation19/APDTA
- Country: United States
- Based in: Scottsdale, Arizona
- Language: English (with Japanese, Samoan, Chinese, Spanish editions)
- Website: www.nation19.com

Nation19 is a magazine that blends hip-hop culture, photojournalism, activism, and anthropology. The printed and digital magazine is produced and published by multimedia activists, visual anthropologists, and film directors Queen Muhammad Ali and Hakeem Khaaliq. The magazine was started in the winter of 2010. Nation19 also produces documentary films and hosts exhibits based on various of its articles. Nation19 is defined by its large photo spreads and motifs of indigenous empowerment, archeological research, and social change.

== Scope ==
Investigative journalism is a regular element of the magazine. A controversial interview with deceased CIA whistleblower and activist Michael Ruppert was published in the "Survival Edition" shortly after his death. The piece focused on the Fukushima nuclear disaster and other issues related to the Pacific Ocean.
