= Lists of killings by law enforcement officers in the United States =

Map of police killings per capita in the United States in 2018

Below are lists of people killed by law enforcement in the United States, both on duty and off duty. Although Congress instructed the Attorney General in 1994 to compile and publish annual statistics on police use of excessive force, this was never carried out, and the Federal Bureau of Investigation does not collect these data.

Deaths by age group in 2015, according to The Counted

A New York Times study reported how outcomes of active shooter attacks varied with actions of the attacker, the police (42% of total incidents), and bystanders (including a "good guy with a gun" outcome in 5.1% of total incidents).

The annual average number of justifiable homicides alone was previously estimated to be near 400. Updated estimates from the Bureau of Justice Statistics released in 2015 estimate the number to be around 930 per year, or 1,240 if assuming that non-reporting local agencies kill people at the same rate as reporting agencies. A 2019 study by Esposito, Lee, and Edwards states that police killings are a leading cause of death for men aged 25–29 at 1.8 per 100000, trailing causes such as accidental death (76.6 per 100000), suicide (26.7 per 100000), and other homicides (22.0 per 100000).

Around 2015–2016, The Guardian newspaper ran its own database, The Counted, which tracked US killings by police and other law enforcement agencies including from gunshots, tasers, car accidents and custody deaths. They counted 1,146 deaths for 2015 and 1,093 deaths for 2016. The database can be viewed by state, gender, race/ethnicity, age, classification (e.g., "gunshot"), and whether the person killed was armed.

The Washington Post has tracked shootings since 2015, reporting more than 5,000 incidents since their tracking began. The database can also classify people in various categories including race, age, weapon etc. For 2019, it reported a total of 1,004 people shot and killed by police. According to the database, 6,600 have been killed since 2015, including 6,303 men and 294 women. Among those killed, 3,878 were armed with a gun, 1,119 were armed with a knife, 218 were armed with a vehicle, 244 had a toy weapon, and 421 were unarmed.

A research brief by the Police Integrity Research Group of Bowling Green State University found that between 2005 and 2019, 104 nonfederal law enforcement officers had been arrested for murder or manslaughter for an on-duty shooting. As of 2019, 80 cases had concluded, with 35 leading to convictions, though often on lesser charges; 18 were convicted of manslaughter and four were convicted of murder.

According to an article in The Lancet, between 1980 and 2018, more than 30,000 were killed by the police. The study estimated that 55.5% of the deaths were incorrectly classified in the U.S. National Vital Statistics System, which tracks information from death certificates. Death certificates do not require coroners to list whether the police were involved in the death which may contribute to the disparity.

== Lists of killings ==
The numbers below show how many total killings per year are recorded in the linked lists; these values may be less than the actual number of people killed by law enforcement if the deaths were not reported. The listing documents the occurrence of a death, without any investigation or elaboration into the department or making no implications regarding wrongdoing or justification on the part of the person(s) killed or officer(s) involved.

| Year(s) (total) | Specific | | | | | | | | | | | |
|---|---|---|---|---|---|---|---|---|---|---|---|---|
| 19th century (112) | 19th century | | | | | | | | | | | |
| 20th century (1929) | 1900s | 1910s | 1920s | 1930s | 1940s | 1950s | 1960s | 1970s | 1980s | 1990s | | |
| 2000s (1406) | 2000 | 2001 | 2002 | 2003 | 2004 | 2005 | 2006 | 2007 | 2008 | 2009 | | |
| 2010 (387) | Jan | Feb | Mar | Apr | May | Jun | Jul | Aug | Sep | Oct | Nov | Dec |
| 2011 (416) | Jan | Feb | Mar | Apr | May | Jun | Jul | Aug | Sep | Oct | Nov | Dec |
| 2012 (647) | Jan | Feb | Mar | Apr | May | Jun | Jul | Aug | Sep | Oct | Nov | Dec |
| 2013 (1060) | Jan | Feb | Mar | Apr | May | Jun | Jul | Aug | Sep | Oct | Nov | Dec |
| 2014 (1040) | Jan | Feb | Mar | Apr | May | Jun | Jul | Aug | Sep | Oct | Nov | Dec |
| 2015 (1108) | Jan | Feb | Mar | Apr | May | Jun | Jul | Aug | Sep | Oct | Nov | Dec |
| 2016 (1068) | Jan | Feb | Mar | Apr | May | Jun | Jul | Aug | Sep | Oct | Nov | Dec |
| 2017 (1053) | Jan | Feb | Mar | Apr | May | Jun | Jul | Aug | Sep | Oct | Nov | Dec |
| 2018 (1022) | Jan | Feb | Mar | Apr | May | Jun | Jul | Aug | Sep | Oct | Nov | Dec |
| 2019 (1052) | Jan | Feb | Mar | Apr | May | Jun | Jul | Aug | Sep | Oct | Nov | Dec |
| 2020 (1146) | Jan | Feb | Mar | Apr | May | Jun | Jul | Aug | Sep | Oct | Nov | Dec |
| 2021 (1045) | Jan | Feb | Mar | Apr | May | Jun | Jul | Aug | Sep | Oct | Nov | Dec |
| 2022 (1058) | Jan | Feb | Mar | Apr | May | Jun | Jul | Aug | Sep | Oct | Nov | Dec |
| 2023 (1092) | Jan | Feb | Mar | Apr | May | Jun | Jul | Aug | Sep | Oct | Nov | Dec |
| 2024 (1406) | Jan | Feb | Mar | Apr | May | Jun | Jul | Aug | Sep | Oct | Nov | Dec |
| 2025 (1288) | Jan | Feb | Mar | Apr | May | Jun | Jul | Aug | Sep | Oct | Nov | Dec |
| 2026 (471) | Jan | Feb | Mar | Apr | May | | | | | | | |

== See also ==
- Death in custody § United States
- Henry A. Wallace Police Crime Public Database
- List of cases of police brutality
- List of countries with annual rates and counts for killings by law enforcement officers
- List of law enforcement officers killed in the line of duty in the United States
- List of law enforcement officers convicted for an on-duty killing in the United States
- List of shootings by US immigration agents
- List of police reforms related to the George Floyd protests
- List of unarmed African Americans killed by law enforcement officers in the United States
- Lists of killings by law enforcement officers
- Police brutality in the United States
- Police misconduct § United States
- Police riot § United States
- Police use of deadly force in the United States
