= List of killings by law enforcement officers in the United States, October 2016 =

This is a list of people reported killed by non-military law enforcement officers in the United States in October 2016, whether in the line of duty or not, and regardless of reason or method. The listing documents the occurrence of a death, making no implications regarding wrongdoing or justification on the part of the person killed or officer involved. Killings are arranged by date of the incident that caused death. Different death dates, if known, are noted in the description. The table below lists 86 people.

== October 2016 ==
Date	Name (age) of deceased	Race	State (city)	Description
2016-10-31	Michelle Lee Shirley (39)	Black	California (Torrance)	Shirley was shot and killed by officers after allegedly ramming her car into a police cruiser following a short chase. Officers had used a PIT maneuver to block Shirley's vehicle when they suspected her of driving under the influence.
2016-10-31	Ashley Sides (31)	White	Ohio (Brookville)	
2016-10-31	Rod Lucas (46)	White	California (Fresno)	
2016-10-31	Jose Armando Cueva (55)	Hispanic	California (Chatsworth)	
2016-10-30	Kenneth Jack Kennedy (34)	White	Arizona (Kingman)	
2016-10-30	Terrence Coleman (31)	Black	Massachusetts (Boston)	
2016-10-30	Michael Dale Vance Jr. (38)	Native American	Oklahoma (Butler)	
2016-10-30	Jordan Gonzales (23)	Hispanic	Texas (Corpus Christi)	
2016-10-29	Luis Armando Lopez (21)	Hispanic	Texas (Van Horn)	
2016-10-28	Jason King (38)	Black	California (Sacramento)	
2016-10-28	Jay Johannes Holmgren (37)	White	Minnesota (Herman)	
2016-10-28	Jun Wang (45)	Asian	Ohio (North Royalton)	
2016-10-27	Edwin Amaya Maldonado (24)	Hispanic	Georgia (Elberton)	
2016-10-27	Lammont Darryl Perry (32)	Black	North Carolina (Wadesboro)	
2016-10-27	Thad Hale (33)	Black	Texas (San Antonio)	
2016-10-27	Kyle W. Killough (32)	White	Montana (Billings)	
2016-10-26	Malcolm Loren Hickson (25)	Black	Texas (Carrollton)	
2016-10-26	William Clifford Cole (36)	White	Oklahoma (Bartlesville)	
2016-10-25	Brandon Jones (25)	White	Maryland (Elkton)	One or more officers shot and killed Brandon Jones and Chelsea Porter while attempting to serve warrants at a motel room. Jones and Porter reportedly pointed pellet guns at the officers, who responded by shooting both people.
2016-10-25	Brandon Wayne Millard (37)	White	California (Lincoln)	
2016-10-25	Roy Lee Richards (46)	Black	Arkansas (Little Rock)	
2016-10-25	Chelsea M. Porter (25)	White	Maryland (Elkton)	One or more officers shot and killed Brandon Jones and Chelsea Porter while attempting to serve warrants at a motel room. Jones and Porter reportedly pointed pellet guns at the officers, who responded by shooting both people.
2016-10-24	Kristofer Daniel Youngquist (45)	White	Minnesota (Lanesboro)	
2016-10-24	Aaron Ballard (19)	Black	Missouri (St. Louis)	
2016-10-23	Kenny Tomblin (38)	White	Kentucky (Edmonton)	
2016-10-23	Demetrious Mac Moore (40)	Black	Colorado (Colorado Springs)	
2016-10-22	Junef Monzon (31)	Native Hawaiian and Pacific Islander	California (Lake Elsinore)	
2016-10-22	Nathaniel B. Dorough (21)	White	Alabama (Sterrett)	
2016-10-21	Renee Davis (23)	Native American	Washington (King County)	King County sheriff's deputies fatally shot Renee Davis after they went to perform a welfare check on her. She was five months pregnant and had a history of depression. According to the sheriff's office, deputies found a young woman with a handgun when they checked on a report of someone suicidal.
2016-10-21	William H. Frost Jr. (58)	White	Oklahoma (Tulsa)	
2016-10-20	Jacob DePetris (29)	White	Florida (Jacksonville)	
2016-10-19	Anthony Garcia (24)	Hispanic	Texas (Dallas)	
2016-10-19	Frank Sandor (38)	White	Ohio (Willoughby)	
2016-10-19	Javier Munoz (28)	Hispanic	Nevada (Henderson)	
2016-10-18	Darius Wimberly (28)	Black	Michigan (Benton Harbor)	
2016-10-18	Salvador Reyes Sanchez (42)	Hispanic	Oklahoma (Tulsa)	
2016-10-18	Charles Stidham (34)	White	Kentucky (Paris)	
2016-10-18	Terrell "Al" Clark (47)	Black	Georgia (Sylvester)	
2016-10-18	Danner, Deborah (66)	Black	New York (New York)	Police were responding to a noise complaint regarding Danner's apartment; she was naked inside the apartment. Police report that they convinced her to drop a pair of scissors and that she then picked up a bat and approached NYPD Sergeant Hugh Barry. Barry shot Danner twice in the torso. Numerous sources have noted parallels to the Eleanor Bumpurs case and questioned why Barry used a firearm instead of the Taser he was also carrying at the time. On the evening of the shooting Barry was placed on modified duty and stripped of his gun and badge.
2016-10-17	Rolando Roman Delgado (50)	Hispanic	Florida (Miami)	
2016-10-17	Keagan Schweikle (17)	White	Arkansas (Benton)	
2016-10-17	Eric St. Germain (39)	White	Florida (Holiday)	
2016-10-16	Sean Arlt (32)	White	California (Santa Cruz)	Arlt, with a history of mental illness, was shot by police after allegedly threatening officers with a metal rake.
2016-10-16	Nicholas McWherter (26)	White	California (San Francisco)	On October 13, a man was confronted by police in a market area in the Sunset District after reports were made of a person causing a disturbance, and the man shot and wounded a San Francisco police officer in the head, critically wounding him. The man was shot by other police officers, and died in a hospital on October 16.
2016-10-16	Micah Dsheigh Jester (26)	White	Texas (Austin)	A woman, allegedly armed with a gun, was shot and killed by police in a South Austin apartment complex.
2016-10-15	Daniel Richard Murphy (38)	White	Alabama (Phenix City)	
2016-10-14	Chaz Logan York (23)	White	Texas (Beaumont)	
2016-10-14	George Zapata (24)	Hispanic	Texas (Dallas)	
2016-10-13	Shawn Pappe (46)	White	Oregon (Grants Pass)	
2016-10-13	Rex Vance Wilson (50)	White	Nevada (Las Vegas)	
2016-10-12	Matthew Brewer (22)	White	Kentucky (Morehead)	
2016-10-12	Blaine Justin Beason (31)	White	Louisiana (Denham Springs)	
2016-10-12	Patrick Reddeck (38)	White	Washington (Kent)	Officers were executing a search warrant at Reddeck's home when they say he brandished a weapon. Reddeck was shot 13 times by officers.
2016-10-12	Kirk Figueroa (33)	Black	Massachusetts (Boston)	Figueroa shot and critically wounded two Boston officers, and was shot in an exchange of gunfire.
2016-10-11	Michael L. Taylor (44)	Asian	Washington (Seattle)	While attempting to clear a homeless camp, officers discovered two men involved in a fight. While trying to separate them, they noticed one of the men, Taylor, had a knife. An officer opened fire, killing him.
2016-10-11	Dominick Musulman (30)	White	California (Concord)	
2016-10-10	Mauricio Barron (27)	Hispanic	California (Irvine)	
2016-10-10	Kheyanev Littledog (19)	Native American	Texas (Midland)	
2016-10-10	Dennis Hunt (50)	Native American	North Carolina (Lumberton)	
2016-10-10	Devan Desnoyers (26)	White	Ohio (Westlake)	
2016-10-09	Deric Brown (41)	Black	New York (Syracuse)	
2016-10-09	Luis Michael Hoff (40)	White	Arizona (Scottsdale)	
2016-10-08	Ricardo Hernandez (21)	Hispanic	Federal Way, Washington	Officers responding to a reported domestic violence situation encountered Hernandez armed with two knives. He told officers he wanted to die, then charged at them. Two officers opened fire, killing him.
2016-10-08	Charles E. Antrup (62)	White	Indiana (Fort Wayne)	
2016-10-08	Kim Jackson (53)	White	California (Modesto)	
2016-10-08	Dylan Rogers (39)	White	Oklahoma (Wetumka)	
2016-10-07	Thomas Burns (49)	White	Arkansas (Benton)	
2016-10-07	Larry Daniel Matthews (57)	Black	Georgia (Macon)	
2016-10-07	Joseph S. Schroeder (36)	White	Indiana (Fort Wayne)	
2016-10-07	Christopher Darnell Shackleford (28)	Black	Louisiana (Alexandria)	
2016-10-07	Eddie Collins (42)	White	Alabama (Killen)	
2016-10-06	Ricky Hall (46)	White	Texas (Houston)	
2016-10-05	Lucas Felkel (35)	White	South Carolina (Moncks Corner)	
2016-10-05	Brandon Simmons (28)	White	Colorado (Boulder)	
2016-10-05	Robert Solberg (32)	Unknown race	Tennessee (Humboldt)	
2016-10-04	Isaias Salgado (31)	Hispanic	Florida (Riverview)	
2016-10-04	Zachary Sutton (26)	White	Arkansas (Springdale)	
2016-10-04	Thomas Wayne Binkley (66)	White	California (Burbank)	
2016-10-04	Dean Allen Bruning (51)	White	Michigan (Hessel)	
2016-10-03	John H. Fetter III (49)	White	New Jersey (Ventnor)	
2016-10-03	Robert "Bobby" Dapkus (57)	White	Massachusetts (Lynn)	Dapkus was a suspect in an armed robbery and was shot and killed outside of his fifth floor apartment after confronting police officers who executed a search warrant.
2016-10-02	Donte Jones (36)	Black	Illinois (Markham)	
2016-10-02	Jose Cesar Viloria (63)	Hispanic	California (Bakersfield)	
2016-10-02	Daniel Enrique Perez (16)	Hispanic	California (South Los Angeles)	With suicidal intentions Perez made a 911 call about a man with a gun and gave a description of himself. After the arrival of officers 20 minutes later he pointed a replica gun, the orange tip of which he had colored black to make it look more real, at them and was shot immediately. He left a farewell note to his family.
2016-10-01	Carnell Snell Jr (18)	Black	California (Los Angeles)	Snell sat in the back seat of a car with invalid plates pulled over by police. After jumping out of the car a chase of several hundred yards ensued. At one point Snell took a fully loaded semi-automatic gun out of his waistband and pointed it at the police officers, who shot and killed him.
2016-10-01	Joshua Perry (28)	White	West Virginia (Hometown)	
