= List of killings by law enforcement officers in the United States, December 2013 =

This is a list of people reported killed by non-military law enforcement officers in the United States in December 2013, whether in the line of duty or not, and regardless of reason or method. The listing documents the occurrence of a death, making no implications regarding wrongdoing or justification on the part of the person killed or officer involved. Killings are arranged by date of the incident that caused death. Different death dates, if known, are noted in the description. The table below lists 72 people.

== December 2013 ==
Date	Name (Age) of Deceased	Race	State (City)	Description
2013-12-31	Dontae Daveon Lewis Hayes (20)	Black	California (Riverside)	
2013-12-31	Ricky Junior Toney (34)	Black	North Carolina (Henderson)	
2013-12-30	James M. Eshelman (54)	White	Washington (Moses Lake)	
2013-12-29	Christopher George (44)	White	Colorado (Longmont)	
2013-12-29	Mitchell Allen Street (51)	White	North Carolina (Sparta)	
2013-12-29	Franklin Jones III (30)	White	Ohio (Troy)	
2013-12-29	William Jackson (43)	Black	Pennsylvania (Harrisburg)	
2013-12-29	Bethany Lytle (31)	White	California (Taft)	
2013-12-29	Kendall Alexander (34)	Black	Louisiana (Breaux Bridge)	
2013-12-29	Joseph Glenn (22)	Unknown race	Louisiana (Ruston)	
2013-12-29	Singh, Jaspal (45)		California (Bakersfield)	Singh was holding a gun and confronted Bakersfield police officers responding to a domestic disturbance call. When he pointed the gun at the officers they shot him several times. He died at a local hospital.
2013-12-28	Garnett, Mario Edward (40)		Arizona (Phoenix)	Garnett was a suspect in a spree of attempted bank robberies that began in Atlanta, followed by another in Mississippi hours later, where two officers were shot and one was killed. Nearly a week later, Garnett was shot to death by a detective after allegedly shooting at officers while robbing a bank in Phoenix.
2013-12-28	Somourian Jamal Wingo (24)	Black	Florida (Palatka)	
2013-12-28	Dante Chavful (37)	Black	Texas (Houston)	
2013-12-27	King, Darnell (22)		Oklahoma (Oklahoma City)	Darnell, an escaped inmate from the Oklahoma Department of Corrections, attempted an armed robbery of an off duty Oklahoma Highway Patrol Trooper at his home. After both individuals entered the home the trooper pulled his firearm and killed the suspect.
2013-12-27	Darrell King (22)	Black	Oklahoma (Oklahoma City)	
2013-12-27	John A. Massey (30)	White	Georgia (Marietta)	
2013-12-27	John Lincoln (49)	White	Texas (Colleyville)	
2013-12-26	Asa James Dolak (19)	White	California (Torrance)	
2013-12-26	James Torres (44)	Black	New York (Bronx)	
2013-12-25	Peyton Cole Barbour (16)	White	Texas (Grand Prairie)	
2013-12-24	Michael Rosales (44)	Hispanic	Texas (Corpus Christi)	
2013-12-24	William Alvin Goodman III (17)	White	Florida (Pensacola)	
2013-12-23	Clowers, Matthew (32)		Arizona (Pinal County)	A sheriff's deputy shot and killed Clowers, who allegedly committed armed robbery, in the back as he ran through a field. Police initially said a shootout had occurred, but later records said Clowers and another man had left their weapons in a car.
2013-12-22	James Lewis Brown (24)	White	North Carolina (Winterville)	
2013-12-21	David P. Giliberti (22)	White	Pennsylvania (Lititz)	
2013-12-21	Goodblanket, Mah-Hi-Vist (18)		Oklahoma (Clinton)	Goodblanket was shot and killed after Custer County Sheriff Deputies responded to a domestic dispute at a residence. Goodblanket was alleged to have been armed with a knife.
2013-12-20	Sharon Rebecca McDowell (49)	Black	South Carolina (Anderson)	
2013-12-19	Cimarron Lamar Lamb (33)	Black	Alabama (Phenix City)	
2013-12-18	Duane Slentz (49)	White	Indiana (Indianapolis)	
2013-12-16	Darold Vadenheuvel (63)	White	Wisconsin (Green Bay)	
2013-12-16	Kevin Ross (29)	White	Illinois (Evanston)	
2013-12-14	Roy David Rhodes (58)	Unknown race	Delaware (Milford)	
2013-12-14	Lawrence Sanchez (49)	Hispanic	Colorado (Grand Junction)	
2013-12-14	Victor Rivera (43)	Hispanic	Hawaii (Waipahu)	
2013-12-13	Gregory Bendas (43)	White	Connecticut (Farmington)	
2013-12-13	Eric M. Anderson (41)	White	Illinois (Arlington Heights)	
2013-12-13	Ricky Taylor (23)	White	Wisconsin (Neillsville)	
2013-12-13	Beaird, Brian (51)		California (Los Angeles)	Police shot Beaird 12 times after a high-speed chase. The Los Angeles Police Department chief found that officers violated the department's policy on use of deadly force, and the department paid a $5 million settlement to Beiard's family, but none of the officers faced criminal charges.
2013-12-12	Harris, Robert J. (43)		Washington (Wenatchee)	A Wenatchee police officer shot and killed Harris in a parking lot after a controlled drug buy that went bad.
2013-12-12	Kenneth R. Herring (50)	Black	Ohio (Columbus)	
2013-12-12	John Knudsen (61)	White	Maine (Hollis)	
2013-12-11	Rodney Stevens (64)	White	Florida (St. Augustine)	
2013-12-11	Krystal Marie Barrows (35)	White	Ohio (Chillicothe)	
2013-12-10	Corsini Valdes (50)	Hispanic	Florida (Miami)	
2013-12-10	Adrian Montesano (27)	White	Florida (Miami)	
2013-12-10	Brandon Marshall (43)	White	California (Saratoga)	
2013-12-09	Paul Slimick (26)	White	Pennsylvania (Monroeville)	
2013-12-08	Andy Snider (37)	White	New Mexico (Albuquerque)	
2013-12-08	Jesus Valdes (54)	Hispanic	Florida (Miami)	
2013-12-08	Ruben Pupo (57)	Hispanic	Florida (Miami)	
2013-12-08	Jared Brown-Garnham (21)	Black	Pennsylvania (Moon)	
2013-12-08	Olin Jr., Milton (65)		California (Calabasas)	The Los Angeles County District Attorney’s Office declined to press charges against a sheriff’s deputy who was apparently distracted by his mobile digital computer when he fatally struck cyclist Milton Olin Jr. in Calabasas in December, officials announced Wednesday.
2013-12-07	Unger Heki, Patrick (26)		Nevada (Las Vegas)	Police were responding to two 911 calls about a possibly suicidal and armed person. Officers encountered Unger, who was allegedly armed with two rifles and a handgun, and they shot and killed him.
2013-12-07	Scott M. Williford (33)	White	Missouri (Independence)	
2013-12-07	Darryl Max Dookhran (20)	Black	Massachusetts (Dorchester)	
2013-12-07	D'Angelo Davis (23)	Black	Washington (Tukwila)	
2013-12-06	Samuel Freeman (23)	Black	Arizona (Pine Bluff)	
2013-12-06	Isaac Lankisch (42)	White	Arizona (Phoenix)	
2013-12-06	Redus, Robert Cameron (23)		Texas (San Antonio)	A man was pulled over for a traffic stop. The officer fired multiple shots at the man who was later pronounced dead at the scene. See here for more information.
2013-12-05	Robert Craig Perry (43)	Unknown race	California (Stockton)	
2013-12-05	George D. Reynolds (49)	Unknown race	Missouri (Independence)	
2013-12-04	Ananias Shaw (73)	Black	Alabama (Selma)	
2013-12-04	Rodriguez, Dixon (32)		New Jersey (Perth Amboy)	Rodriguez, schizophrenic and off his medications, was brandishing a knife and his mother called police. With the knife, he lunged at the officers, who shot him dead. The prosecutor's office determined the shooting was justified.
2013-12-03	Darius Jamal Murphy (19)	Black	Washington, DC	
2013-12-03	Steven Jon Vogel (38)	White	Iowa (Des Moines)	
2013-12-02	Jonathan D. Rodgers (22)	Black	Ohio (Columbus)	
2013-12-02	Scott Mitchell (46)	White	Arizona (Tucson)	
2013-12-02	David Greenwood (49)	White	Tennessee (Etowah)	
2013-12-01	Shaine Sherrill (34)	White	New Mexico (Albuquerque)	
2013-12-01	Anthony Bruno (26)	White	Missouri (Kansas City)	
2013-12-01	Joshua D. Ford (33)	White	Missouri (Bois D'Arc)	

== See also ==
- Death in custody § United States
- Henry A. Wallace Police Crime Public Database
- List of cases of police brutality
- List of countries with annual rates and counts for killings by law enforcement officers
- List of law enforcement officers killed in the line of duty in the United States
- List of law enforcement officers convicted for an on-duty killing in the United States
- List of police reforms related to the George Floyd protests
- List of unarmed African Americans killed by law enforcement officers in the United States
- Lists of killings by law enforcement officers
- Police brutality in the United States
- Police misconduct § United States
- Police riot § United States
- Police use of deadly force in the United States
