= List of killings by law enforcement officers in the United States, November 2013 =

This is a list of people reported killed by non-military law enforcement officers in the United States in November 2013, whether in the line of duty or not, and regardless of reason or method. The listing documents the occurrence of a death, making no implications regarding wrongdoing or justification on the part of the person killed or officer involved. Killings are arranged by date of the incident that caused death. Different death dates, if known, are noted in the description. The table below lists 77 people.

== November 2013 ==
Date	Name (Age) of Deceased	Race	State (City)	Description
2013-11-29	Lorenzo Aguilar, 23	Hispanic	California (Azusa)	A man pointed a handgun at police officers during a traffic stop. Officers fired at the man, striking him in the torso. The man died.
2013-11-29	Kalyuzhnyy, Leonid (51)	White	Washington (Seattle)	A man was shot and killed after allegedly firing a rifle at officers from an apartment window in the Capitol Hill neighborhood.
2013-11-29	Jerry Paul Stovall III (22)	White	Texas (San Marcos)	A man took his ex-girlfriend hostage and led authorities on a high-speed overnight chase for 50 miles in a stolen police vehicle. When the suspect stopped during the chase, he barricaded himself and held the woman at gunpoint. He then pointed the handgun at SWAT officers. The SWAT officers opened fire on the suspect, killing him. The hostage suffered a minor injury to her leg.
2013-11-28	Vasquez, Albert Manuel (42)	Hispanic	California (San Jose)	A man who was suspected of stabbing and injuring three people inside a home fled in a van. As police tried to encountered him, the suspect tried to do a U-turn into the patrol car to hit the patrol car, and the cops started shooting at him. The suspect died.
2013-11-28	Troy D. Harden (44)	White	Indiana (Nashville)	
2013-11-28	Charles Eimers (61)	White	Florida (Key West)	
2013-11-28	Scott Alan Pfeffer (48)	White	Colorado (Strasburg)	
2013-11-27	Jason Akeem Lewis (28)	Black	Alabama (Huntsville)	
2013-11-27	Ramirez, Simon P. (30)	Hispanic	Oklahoma (Oklahoma City)	Ramirez was shot and killed after allegedly pointing a firearm at officers during a traffic stop.
2013-11-26	Ervin Edwards (38)	Black	Louisiana (Port Allen)	
2013-11-26	Brian Christopher Leggitt (31)	White	Florida (Orlando)	
2013-11-25	Carnell Lanair Williams (23)	Black	Connecticut (Bridgeport)	
2013-11-25	Robert Reagh Gillon (72)	Hispanic	California (Los Angeles)	
2013-11-25	Clarence Dorris (53)	Black	Georgia (Mableton)	
2013-11-24	Habay, Michael (42)	White	Colorado (Boulder)	Police responded to a call about a man with a knife and machete, stabbing a post outside an apartment. When there was no answer at the door police kicked down the door. Habay reported charged officers holding two knives. He was shot three times and died.
2013-11-23	Jimmy Cruz (24)	Unknown race	California (South Gate)	
2013-11-23	Jeremy Tyler McGee (24)	White	Texas (Fort Worth)	
2013-11-22	Shane David Cataline (30)	White	Illinois (Rock Falls)	
2013-11-22	Tyler Keinonen (31)	White	Oregon (Bend)	
2013-11-22	Adolfo Ramirez (37)	Hispanic	California (Riverside)	
2013-11-22	Jose Jovanny Mendoza (18)	Hispanic	California (Los Angeles)	
2013-11-22	Thomas Bradley Garza (26)	White	Texas (Fort Worth)	
2013-11-22	Brown, Robert (26)	Black	Washington, D.C.	Brown was shot and killed in southeast D.C. by police after taking out a weapon in front of officers. Officers attempted to question Brown regarding a homicide investigation.
2013-11-22	Thornton, Danny (47)	Black	Ohio (Columbus)	Thornton, a suspect in the shooting of his ex-girlfriend and the child of another ex-girlfriend, was killed during a confrontation with police.
2013-11-21	Timothy Mahoney (58)	White	Florida (San Mateo)	
2013-11-20	Marty Maiden II (20)	Black	Arizona (Tucson)	
2013-11-20	Christopher Lee Koziatek (44)	White	Oregon (Eugene)	
2013-11-20	Andrew John Beard (46)	White	Texas (San Antonio)	
2013-11-20	Murnieks, Andrew (28)	White	New Jersey (South Brunswick)	Murnieks, a schizophrenic man off his medications, barricaded himself inside his house and his mother called police. As they approached, he allegedly opened the door and raised a large knife; police retreated. After hours of negotiations failed, police entered the residence where Murnieks allegedly assaulted one of the officers and was then shot in the chest.
2013-11-19	Huerta, Jesus (18)	Hispanic	North Carolina (Durham)	Huerta died from gunshot wounds sustained while in police custody, handcuffed in the back seat of a patrol car.
2013-11-19	Clay, Larry (44)	White	Arizona (Prescott)	Police responded to a suicidal suspect call. Clay was fatally shot when he reportedly charged officers while holding two knives.
2013-11-19	Courtright, Wayne (59)	Unknown	California (Guerneville)	Courtright was intoxicated and was threatening his wife, who managed a resort in Guerneville that he was staying at. Courtright exited the resort with a high-powered rifle and fired in the direction of the deputies. The deputies then fired eight shots at Courtright, hitting him once in the chest, killing him. The Sonoma County DA announced in December 2014 that no charges would be filed.
2013-11-19	Whittle, Lennord (25)	Black	New York (Middletown)	Whittle, 25, was fatally shot Nov. 19 by two City of Middletown police officers — one male, one female — outside Sam's Food Mart on Academy Avenue in Middletown. Police had responded to a call that Whittle was menacing another man with a knife.
2013-11-19	Hathaway, Joshua (19)	White	Virginia (Lynchburg)	Hathaway, a Liberty University student, was attacking a Liberty University Emergency Services Officer with a hammer. The attack prompted the officer to shoot Hathaway.
2013-11-19	Peter J. Oien (47)	White	California (Chino Hills)	
2013-11-18	James Steven Fay (55)	White	Florida (Boynton Beach)	A man exited his house while police were arriving outside to respond to a call of domestic abuse at the home. The man pointed his handgun at the police officers, and refused to drop it after officers commanded him to. Police fired three shots at the man, killing him.
2013-11-18	Woods, Tyler Damon (19)	Black	California (Long Beach)	Woods shot and killed by police while he was standing on top of the roof an apartment building. No weapon was found on him. An arrest warrant issued for Woods described him as an armed and dangerous felon, and Woods was a suspect in an armed robbery and carjacking.
2013-11-18	Antoine Duane Goodrum (27)	Unknown	Maryland (Germantown)	A man called police saying he had shot and killed two people in a home. When officers arrived at the home, they determined the man had left the home by foot. Police officers encountered the man carrying a rifle a half a mile away. Police say the suspect did not comply with the officers' orders, and then shot and killed him. The home where the suspect called police at was searched, and nobody was found shot there.
2013-11-18	Dasrath, Rexford (23)	Black	New York (New York City)	According to police, Dasrath was banging on the windows of their patrol car in Bushwick, Brooklyn. The officers exited the police cruiser, and Dasrath ran at them with a knife. Police then shot and killed Dasrath.
2013-11-18	Bell, Steven J. (38)	White	New York (Berlin)	A man was shot and killed by officers after he was confronted by New York State Police. The suspect who was shot was being questioned for criminal investigation.
2013-11-18	Brian Anthony Costley (53)	Unknown race	Pennsylvania (Hanover)	
2013-11-17	White, Jason (31)	Black	Ohio (Columbus)	Three Columbus police officers shot a man who was wielding a knife at an apartment complex in Columbus' Far West Side neighborhood.
2013-11-17	Bandler, Robert (78)	White	California (Los Angeles)	An armed man called a utility worker to his Bel Air house, and reportedly threatened him with a gun. Police encountered the suspect at the home and then fatally shot him.
2013-11-17	Jonathan Wilcher (26)	Black	Florida (Titusville)	According to police, Wilcher walked towards officers, and officers shot at him with a stun gun. He then took out a firearm from his waistband and pointed it towards officers. The man was then shot and killed by police.
2013-11-16	Devin Johnson (32)	Black	Indiana (Indianapolis)	
2013-11-16	Nicholas Simonitch (22)	White	Kansas (Kansas City)	
2013-11-15	Ted Christopher Hoffstrom (30)	White	Minnesota (Orono)	A man armed with a handgun was shot to death by police at a house. Another person was found shot to death near the scene.
2013-11-15	Naharro-Gionet, Andrea (61)	White	California (Santa Clara County)	Police responded to disturbance call. They encountered a woman holding a knife. She refused to drop the knife and reportedly backed one of the deputies into a corner, whereupon the deputy fatally shot her. Family of Naharro-Gionet say she had multiple sclerosis and did not pose a threat.
2013-11-15	Paul Aguilar (21)	Hispanic	California (Rosemead)	
2013-11-15	Gary Boyd Sr. (42)	Black	New Jersey (Hamilton Township)	
2013-11-14	John Carvill Williams (49)	White	Arkansas (Mabelvale)	
2013-11-14	Bill Larry Jones (53)	Black	Texas (San Antonio)	
2013-11-13	Santellana, Jonathan (17)	Hispanic	Texas (Houston)	Santellana was shot and killed by Navasota Officer Rey Garza, whom was off duty at the time. Garza claimed he suspected drug related activity going on in Santellana's car. As Garza approached in street clothes, the passenger in the car said they thought they were being robbed so Santellana put the car in reverse to flee. The car struck Garza who retaliated by discharging his weapon and shooting Santellana twice in the back. Garza was brought before the Harris County Grand Jury but was not indicted.
2013-11-13	Abraham Martinez (24)	Hispanic	California (Hawthorne)	
2013-11-13	Willie James Williams (27)	Black	Georgia (Columbus)	
2013-11-11	Rieves, Shawn M. (17)	Black	Wisconsin (Milwaukee)	Rieves, a suspect in an attempted carjacking, was shot and killed by police in downtown Milwaukee.
2013-11-11	Montgomery, John W. (59)	Unknown	Ohio (Westerville)	Montgomery was shot by police after he was holding a gun as the officer approached his car during a traffic stop.
2013-11-11	Abdul Kamal (30)	Black	New Jersey (Irvington)	
2013-11-11	David Andrew Gaston (56)	White	California (Crestline)	
2013-11-10	Christopher James Ryckeart (31)	White	Indiana (Elkhart)	
2013-11-10	Donte Lamonte Jordan (39)	Black	California (Long Beach)	Jordan fired multiple rounds at the driver of a dark colored vehicle at a gas station. The man in that car was not hit. Nearby, police officers opened fire on Jordan, killing him. It is unknown if he fired at the police officers.
2013-11-08	White, Don (24)	Black	Louisiana (New Orleans)	White was shot and killed after driving towards a police officer.
2013-11-07	Brunette, Wayne (49)	White	Vermont (Burlington)	Police Chief Michael Schirling said officers were responding to a call from Ruthine "Dolly" Brunette, who said her son was acting irrationally and destroying property at their Randy Lane home. Police discovered the man armed with a shovel and after an undisclosed amount of time, they shot and killed him.
2013-11-07	Anaya, Jeanette (39)	Hispanic	New Mexico (Santa Fe)	According to New Mexico State Police, Anaya was seen driving erratically, and fled when police attempted to pull her over at 1:15 AM. A 5-minute high-speed chase ensued, whereupon the police executed a pursuit intervention maneuver, causing her to crash into a residential wall. When the police officer approached Anaya, she "began to aggressively and immediately back towards the officer" in her vehicle, according to police statements. The officer opened fire, killing Anaya. A 34-year-old male passenger suffered minor injuries.
2013-11-06	Quinonez, Jose (22)	Hispanic	New Jersey (Newark)	The 22-year-old Newark man was the target of a drug investigation. When Quinonez tried to flee from the veteran detectives conducting the investigation, police shot and killed him. Eyewitnesses stated Quinonez was unarmed and walking to his mother's house when an unmarked police car drove up behind him. However, police claim he was armed after finding a gun on the body.
2013-11-05	Traylor, Deonte (24)	Black	California (Fairfield)	Traylor, a parolee suspected of stabbing his girlfriend more than 30 times, was shot and killed by multiple Fairfield police officers on Highway 12 after he lunged at officers with a knife.
2013-11-05	Jerry Vue (27)	Asian	California (Fresno)	
2013-11-04	Michael Blair (26)	Black	Texas (Richmond)	
2013-11-04	Robert Desir (23)	Black	Florida (Miami Gardens)	
2013-11-04	Comstock, Tyler (19)	White	Iowa (Ames)	Comstock was shot dead by Officer Adam McPherson, an 8-year-veteran of the department, at the end of an at-times high-speed pursuit through the city's streets that ended on the college campus.
2013-11-03	Cambra, Lawrence (88)	Unknown	Oregon (Oregon City)	Police were responding to a house fire and a report of an armed person at the scene. After a responding officer was shot, more officers including two SWAT units responded to the scene. The alleged shooter fled to a nearby house and was eventually found and shot by SWAT team members, though he died of a self-inflicted gunshot wound.
2013-11-03	Nattela Ruth Blackwell (64)	White	Tennessee (Covington)	
2013-11-03	Alfred San Antonio (51)	White	Arizona (Phoenix)	
2013-11-02	Salvador Munoz (22)	Hispanic	Texas (Dallas)	
2013-11-01	Thomas Ardd (44)	Black	Mississippi (Enterprise)	
2013-11-01	Carlos Saenz (27)	Hispanic	California (Paramount)	
2013-11-01	Rosa Elvira Flores-Lopez (50)	Hispanic	Texas (Port Arthur)	

== See also ==
- Death in custody § United States
- Henry A. Wallace Police Crime Public Database
- List of cases of police brutality
- List of countries with annual rates and counts for killings by law enforcement officers
- List of law enforcement officers killed in the line of duty in the United States
- List of law enforcement officers convicted for an on-duty killing in the United States
- List of shootings by US immigration agents
- List of police reforms related to the George Floyd protests
- List of unarmed African Americans killed by law enforcement officers in the United States
- Lists of killings by law enforcement officers
- Police brutality in the United States
- Police misconduct § United States
- Police riot § United States
- Police use of deadly force in the United States
