= List of killings by law enforcement officers in the United States, December 2017 =

This is a list of people reported killed by non-military law enforcement officers in the United States in December 2017, whether in the line of duty or not, and regardless of reason or method. The listing documents the occurrence of a death, making no implications regarding wrongdoing or justification on the part of the person killed or officer involved. Killings are arranged by date of the incident that caused death. Different death dates, if known, are noted in the description. The table below lists 85 people.

== December 2017 ==
Date	Name (age) of deceased	Race	State (city)	Description
2017-12-31	Matthew Riehl (37)	White	Colorado (Highlands Ranch)	Highlands Ranch police were called to the apartment of Riehl, a mentally ill man, twice in the early morning hours of December 31. When the same group of officers returned for the second time, Riehl opened fire with a semi-automatic rifle, and fatally wounding Zackari "Zack" Parrish, a 29-year-old deputy who had worked for the Douglas County Sheriff's Office for seven months. A SWAT team was dispatched to the apartment about an hour later, and after a brief standoff, a SWAT officer shot and killed Riehl."
2017-12-31	Ernie Macias (32)	Hispanic	California (Bakersfield)	"He was shot during a police investigation into a suspicious vehicle in an alley off Norwalk Street. Police said officers were approaching the vehicle when the driver, Macias, accelerated towards an officer. The officer fired his gun in self-defense, police said."
2017-12-30	Oscar Sandoval (39)	Hispanic	California (Winnetka)	"LAPD officials said via Twitter Saturday night that officers were responding to a "family dispute" with reports of the suspect possibly armed with a handgun. The shooting happened after officers responded to an assault-with-deadly-weapon and shots-fired radio call at about 7:20 p.m. in the 6900 block of Oakdale Avenue, said Los Angeles Police Department Officer Irma Mota. When officers from the Topanga Division arrived, they heard shots being fired and saw the suspect leave the location."
2017-12-30	Heath Wayne Hodges (36)	White	Texas (Iowa Park)	"An Iowa Park man has been killed during an officer-involved shooting in Foard County, according to a Texas Department of Public Safety news release. Heath Wayne Hodges, 36, was killed in the incident, the release states. The DPS news release states the shooting happened around 10 p.m. Saturday night near Crowell, Texas. The Foard County Sheriff's deputy was not injured and has been placed on administrative leave by Foard County Sheriff Mike Brown during the investigation of the incident."
2017-12-30	Marco Antonio Carlos (31)	Hispanic	California (Redwood City)	"A 31-year-old has been identified as the armed man who was killed by police outside a bank in downtown Redwood City Saturday afternoon. Marco Antonio Carlos, a Redwood City transient, was named as the person who died during the Dec. 30 confrontation, according to the San Mateo County Coroner's Office. The District Attorney's Office is now investigating what was the fourth fatal officer-involved shooting to occur in San Mateo County in 2017 alone."
2017-12-30	Jarvis Lykes (35)	Black	Georgia (Columbus)	"A man fleeing from a DUI checkpoint is dead after he was shot by a trooper with the Georgia State Patrol Friday at the dead end of Lumpkin Court, a witness and authorities said Saturday. Jarvis Lykes, 35, of Columbus was pronounced dead of a gunshot wound to the right shoulder at 10:37 p.m. in the emergency room at Midtown Medical Center, said Muscogee County Chief Deputy Coroner Freeman Worley. His body will be transported to the crime lab in Decatur for an autopsy. The unidentified trooper wasn't injured during the incident, the Georgia Bureau of Investigation said in a release. The shooting remains under investigation by the GBI after a request from the Georgia State Patrol."
2017-12-29	Andrew Finch (28)	White	Kansas (Wichita)	"Call of Duty gaming community points to 'swatting' in deadly Wichita police shooting. Online gamers have said in multiple Twitter posts that the shooting of a man Thursday night by Wichita police was the result of a "swatting" hoax involving two gamers." See also 2017 Wichita, Kansas swatting.
2017-12-29	Christopher Baird (37)	White	Alabama (Birmingham)	"The shooting happened about 6:30 p.m. at the Days Inn on U.S. 280. South Precinct officers were dispatched to the motel after several people reported seeing a suspicious man with a gun who had knocked on several doors. When officers arrived, they ordered the suspect - now identified as 37-year-old Christopher Baird - to drop his weapon. He lowered it, but then raised it again and that's when officer fired on him. Baird, of Vestavia Hills, was pronounced dead on the scene. The State Bureau of Investigation has taken over the probe, which is standard operating procedure in police-involved shootings."
2017-12-28	Isaiah Christian Green (21)	Black	Pennsylvania (York County)	"The 911 phone call that drew a Northern York County Regional Police officer to Isaiah Christian Green's home early Thursday morning was quick. What is known is that the officer fatally shot Green, 21, a former Dover football standout, who approached the officer with an AR-15 rifle."
2017-12-28	Corey Bailey (30)	Black	Indiana (Elkhart)	"A suspect in an Elkhart officer-involved shooting has died, according to police. Police say he was trying to carjack someone when police shot him. Police say 30-year-old Corey Bailey of Elkhart was pointing a handgun at a driver. That's when Elkhart Police officers Daniel Mayer and Jared Davies shot the suspect. This whole incident starting with a bank robbery."
2017-12-28	Christina Chavez (40)	Hispanic	California (South Gate)	
2017-12-27	Kenneth J. Perna-Rutsky (38)	White	Virginia (Chester)	
2017-12-27	Brooke Amelia Camacho (38)	White	Texas (Farmers Branch)	"A woman has died in an exchange of gunfire with a suburban Dallas police officer following a late-night traffic stop. Police in Farmers Branch say the officer had initiated the traffic stop late Tuesday and was speaking with the driver when the officer asked the woman, a passenger in the car, to exit the vehicle. The woman, identified as 38-year-old Brooke Amelia Camacho, then pulled a gun and shot the unidentified officer. The officer was able to return fire and shot Camacho. Both were taken to a hospital where Camacho died. The officer was later released and authorities say his bulletproof vest saved his life."
2017-12-27	Dennis Plowden (25)	Black	Pennsylvania (Philadelphia)	"An unarmed Philadelphia man was shot and killed Wednesday night by a plainclothes police officer. NBC Philadelphia reports cops approached motorist Dennis Plowden after spotting his 2013 Hyundai. The cops, who were undercover at the time, claim the vehicle and license plate were connected to a homicide in the area. When the officers exited their unmarked car and began advancing on the 25-year-old, Plowden sped off. His car hit the cops' vehicle and allegedly struck one of the officers. When cops later caught up with Plowden, he'd hit two other nearby cars. The married father of two took off on foot and cops said he didn't adhere to instructions to put his hands up. Plowden, who then sat down on the sidewalk, later reached into his pocket. One of the officers, who has yet to be identified, claimed he thought the young man was reaching for a gun and shot him in the head. No weapons were discovered on him."
2017-12-26	Jose Garcia (31)	Hispanic	Washington (Yakima)	"31-year-old Jose Garcia died after being shot at the Cascade Apartments in downtown Yakima by Officer Shane Stevie and Officer Patrick Shad. Officer Stevie has been with the department for three years; Officer Shad for just one. Garcia was a blind man, but also had an extensive criminal history. Cascade Apartments residents called 911 after he began threatening people with a gun. Officers Stevie and Shad had obtained a warrant and were trying to arrest Garcia, but Yakima Police say the situation deteriorated and shots were fired."
2017-12-26	Robert Miller (40)	White	California (Tulare)	"The man killed by a Tulare police who was investigating a domestic violence call was identified Thursday as Robert Miller, 40. Sgt. John Hamlin also reported that Miller was armed with a loaded, .40 caliber Smith & Wesson pistol with a round in the chamber at the time of the incident. Police did not identify the officer who fired on Miller during the incident or say how many rounds were fired at Miller."
2017-12-26	James Allan Berones (46)	White	New Mexico (Roswell)	"An attempt to serve an arrest warrant for domestic violence charges led to a standoff and a fatal officer-involved shooting in Roswell Tuesday. The Roswell Police Department on Wednesday said SWAT team officers shot and killed the suspect, 46-year-old James Alan Berrones, after he initially opened fire on them. The standoff began at 9 a.m. Tuesday on the 3800 block of East Pine Lodge Road when officers arrived to issue the warrant, but RPD Public Information Officer Todd Wildermuth said Berrones refused to leave a large shed. That shed also caught fire. Police received a call about the domestic dispute seven hours before the standoff at the apartment of Berrones' ex-girlfriend on West McGaffey Street. Wildermuth said Berrones allegedly pointed a gun at the woman during an argument, forced her on the ground, hit her in the face with the gun and left."
2017-12-26	Jesse Scarsbrook (28)	Black	Indiana (Lawrence)	"Lawrence police say the suspect at the center of a deadly shootout with officers was recently released from prison. Witnesses say Scarsbrook got out of a vehicle Tuesday, after crashing it, like a madman. They say he started shooting with no regard for the busy intersection of Pendleton Pike and Post Road, or nearby businesses."
2017-12-26	Robo Raikoglo (30)	White	California (Desert Hot Springs)	"Police said they were called to the 13400 block of Cielo Azul Way at 9:15 p.m. Tuesday after a report of shots being fired due to a domestic disturbance. A woman said she had been assaulted by her partner, who fired multiple shots at her before leaving, a news release said. The suspect returned to the residence while police were interviewing the victim. After officers identified themselves, the man leaned out his vehicle window and aimed a gun at them, the release said."
2017-12-26	Salvador Byassee (34)	Hispanic	Tennessee (Jackson)	"Salvador Byassee, 34, of Clinton, Kentucky, was shot and killed by an officer with the Hickman County Sheriff's Department in Kentucky, according to the TBI. Prior to the shooting, at approximately 1:15 a.m. Tuesday morning, Byassee did not yield to a sobriety checkpoint being conducted by the Kentucky State Police on Highway 1218 in Hickman County, which resulted in an initial pursuit by the Kentucky State Police and the Hickman County Sheriff's Department. Byassee temporarily evaded police after wrecking his car and fleeing on foot in Weakley County. Byassee later stole a car in Weakley County and was again located by the Hickman County Sheriff's Department while they were still in the area. This second pursuit ended with the fatal shooting, according to the TBI."
2017-12-26	Joshua Spottedhorse (36)	Native American	Washington (Spokane)	"Tammy McCabe had just opened the front doors of the Safeway store on Northwest Boulevard on Tuesday when a man approached. "He asked me which register was open," the 47-year-old employee said over the phone Thursday afternoon. "I said, 'I can help you at number 4.' "What happened next, McCabe said, was swift and yet seemed to drag on forever. The man, later identified as 36-year-old Joshua Spottedhorse, came up to her from behind and demanded cash from the register. Fumbling at the computer screen, McCabe told Spottedhorse that she was "going as fast as I can," she recalled. "At that time he puts his arm around my neck and puts the gun at my side." McCabe was struggling to sign in, but when she did, the register opened and Spottedhorse took the $300 it contained. He walked quickly out the front door and into the parking lot, where McCabe said he shot his gun, most likely into the air. Less than an hour later, Spottedhorse would find himself in a foot-chase with officers in the area of West Sharp Avenue and North Madison Street, where he would be shot and killed."
2017-12-26	Nathaniel Fritz Macalevy (44)	White	Oregon (Boring)	
2017-12-25	Jacob Craig (31)	White	Oklahoma (Tulsa)	
2017-12-25	Adrian Escobar (28)	Hispanic	Washington (Yakima)	Police shot Escobar during a standoff in which he allegedly fired at officers.
2017-12-24	Charlie Joseph Murillo (25)	Hispanic	Arizona (Phoenix)	
2017-12-24	Evelio Gomez (46)	Hispanic	Texas (Weslaco)	
2017-12-24	Shelby Comer (21)	White	Tennessee (Tracy City)	
2017-12-24	Cody Eyre (20)	White	Alaska (Fairbanks)	
2017-12-23	Jesse J. Champney (26)	White	New Hampshire (Canaan)	
2017-12-23	Jesse Daniel Murillo (32)	Hispanic	California (Los Angeles)	
2017-12-22	Jeffrey John Golnick (40)	White	Minnesota (Gilbert)	
2017-12-22	Ahmed Aminamin El-Mofty (51)	Asian	Pennsylvania (Harrisburg)	
2017-12-22	Lawrence McClellon (62)	Unknown race	Idaho (Pocatello)	
2017-12-21	Mary Mantynen	White	California (Ukiah)	
2017-12-21	Jose Angel Aguero (26)	Hispanic	Colorado (Greeley)	
2017-12-21	Charles McBride (56)	Black	Alaska (Anchorage)	
2017-12-21	Frankie Larry Anchondo (35)	Hispanic	New Mexico (Farmington)	
2017-12-21	Kameron Prescott (6)	Hispanic	Texas (Schertz)	Police shot and killed Amanda Lee Jones after she allegedly tried to break into a mobile home. During the shooting, stray bullets also hit Kameron Prescott, a six-year-old boy inside the mobile home.
2017-12-21	Amanda Lee Jones (30)	White	Texas (Schertz)	Police shot and killed Amanda Lee Jones after she allegedly tried to break into a mobile home. During the shooting, stray bullets also hit Kameron Prescott, a six-year-old boy inside the mobile home.
2017-12-20	Robert Edwards (33)	White	Ohio (Miamisburg)	
2017-12-20	Javier Gomez	Hispanic	California (Oceanside)	
2017-12-19	Tommy J. Heath (56)	White	Arkansas (Mulberry)	
2017-12-19	Shaquille Rogers (24)	Black	Texas (The Colony)	
2017-12-19	Curtis Elroy Tade (46)	White	Washington (Kirkland)	Police responded to an emergency call of a woman screaming and shots fired. When they arrived, officers say a man met them outside with an assault-style rifle. The police then got in a confrontation with the man and shot him, killing him.
2017-12-18	Todd A. Stone (48)	Black	Michigan (Oak Park)	
2017-12-17	Johnathan David Crawford Melton (27)	White	Tennessee (Charleston)	
2017-12-17	Spencer Crumbley (52)	White	West Virginia (Valley Head)	
2017-12-17	Willie Floyd McCord (52)	Black	Washington (Bremerton)	Two officers made contact with McCord, who was sitting in his SUV, suspecting him of violating a protection order. McCord fired at the officers, hitting both of them. They returned fire, hitting and killing McCord.
2017-12-15	Robert Allen Morrison (57)	White	Virginia (Lexington)	
2017-12-15	Adam Radcliffe (30)	White	Delaware (Wilmington)	
2017-12-15	Clifford Keller (34)	White	Tennessee (McMinnville)	
2017-12-15	Eric Campbell	White	New York (Yonkers)	
2017-12-14	Zoe "Gangstalicious" Dowdell (20)	Black	Connecticut (New Britain)	Dowdell, who was a rapper known as "Gangstalicious", was shot and killed while two teenage passengers were injured by gunfire after a police chase. The incident was controversial because one of the passengers raised his hands in surrender before the shots were fired. Black Lives Matter staged protest in the weeks that followed. The five officers involved in the shooting were cleared of wrongdoing in 2019.
2017-12-13	Billy Ray Sims	White	Alabama (Hamilton)	
2017-12-13	Nicholas Grant Lovett	White	California (Boron)	
2017-12-13	Jeremy Warren Patscheck (22)	White	Colorado (Northglenn)	
2017-12-12	Marcia Metzger Aiken (50)	White	Georgia (Rincon)	
2017-12-11	Kyle Gray (24)	White	Washington (Seattle)	After an armed robbery, Gray led police on a car chase. He fired shots at them before exiting his vehicle at Magnuson Park. Officers confronted him a short distance away from his car. Seven officers opened fire, killing him.
2017-12-11	Stacy Micheletti (51)	White	Montana (Great Falls)	
2017-12-10	Ira Crawford (26)	Black	Alabama (Mobile)	
2017-12-10	Kyle Zahacefski (24)	White	California (San Diego)	
2017-12-10	Kyle Anthony Mihecoby (28)	Native American	OK (Oklahoma City)	
2017-12-10	Emanuel Miera (26)	Hispanic	Colorado (Pueblo)	
2017-12-10	Frank Lopez (49)	Hispanic	California (Artesia)	
2017-12-09	James Newman (69)	White	Arkansas (Rose Bud)	
2017-12-09	Juliun Pitcher (16)	White	Delaware (Dover)	
2017-12-08	Vernchoy Saechao (22)	Native Hawaiian and Pacific Islander	California (Redding)	
2017-12-07	John Souder (40)	White	Pennsylvania (Old Forge)	
2017-12-07	Kyler Grabbingbear (19)	Native American	Colorado (Denver)	
2017-12-07	Frederick Douglas Wilburn Jr. (34)	Black	Arizona (Tucson)	
2017-12-07	Jesse Cole Shuping (35)	White	Wisconsin (Marinette)	
2017-12-06	David Facen (54)	Black	Florida (Miami)	
2017-12-06	Scott Addison (49)	White	Wyoming (Cheyenne)	
2017-12-06	Robert Page (71)	Unknown race	Florida (Coral Springs)	
2017-12-06	Jean Pedro Pierre (42)	Black	Florida (Lauderdale Lakes)	
2017-12-05	Johnny D. Carter (24)	Black	Virginia (Bassett)	
2017-12-05	Mario Sanabria (69)	Hispanic	New York (Bronx)	"Man armed with machete killed in police-involved shooting in Mott Haven section of the Bronx. Authorities say a man armed with a machete was killed in a police-involved shooting in the Bronx early Tuesday. The man, identified as 69-year-old Mario Sanabria, was shot in an apartment on the third floor of a building at 230 Brook Avenue in the Mott Haven section just after 4:15 a.m. Police say members of the NYPD Emergency Services Division were executing a search warrant at the apartment, and that two members of the team went to a rear bedroom where they were confronted by a man brandishing a machete-type sword with a two-foot blade. The man was ordered to drop the weapon and allegedly refused to comply. Police say when the suspect continued to approach an officer, the officer fired one shot, striking the man in the chest. Sanabria was pronounced dead at Lincoln Hospital. Authorities say he was not the suspect for whom police were initially searching."
2017-12-04	Jeffrey Scott Cantrell (46)	White	Georgia (Monticello)	Police responded to a 911 call about a man with a firearm. "Gunfire was exchanged" inside of a house and police fatally shot Cantrell. No officers were injured. Cantrell was potentially having a mental health crisis.
2017-12-03	Gregory Ham (62)	White	Texas (La Marque)	
2017-12-02	Mario Guevara (37)	Hispanic	California (Colton)	
2017-12-02	Christopher Louis Willard (33)	White	Colorado (Colorado Springs)	
2017-12-02	Delbert McNeil (49)	White	Texas (Hamlin)	
2017-12-01	Keita O'Neal (42)	Black	California (San Francisco)	"A rookie San Francisco police officer fatally shot an unarmed carjacking suspect in the city's Bayview neighborhood, newly released body camera footage shows. San Francisco Police Chief Bill Scott released body camera video and street surveillance footage Thursday night that shows Keita O'Neil, 42, jumping out of a stolen minivan and running by a patrol car as the officer fires through the glass window and O'Neil falls to the ground." On November 23, 2020, the officer was charged with manslaughter.
2017-12-01	Trent Fondren (33)	White	South Carolina (York)	
2017-12-01	Rufus Cedric Baker (32)	Black	North Carolina (Hendersonville)	
