= List of killings by law enforcement officers in the United States in the 1910s =

This is a list of people reported killed by non-military law enforcement officers in the United States in the 20th century, whether in the line of duty or not, and regardless of reason or method. The listing documents the occurrence of a death, making no implications regarding wrongdoing or justification on the part of the person killed or officer involved. Killings are arranged by date of the incident that caused death. Different death dates, if known, are noted in the description. This page lists 42 people.

== 1900-1919 ==
The table below lists 42 people.

Date	Name (age) of deceased		State (city)	Description
1919-12-29	Henry Massey		Oklahoma (Muskogee)	
1919-12-29	Frank Tutt, Jr. (16)		California (Martinre)	
1919-12-27	Herman Jost (45)		Ohio (Akron)	
1919-12-20	Oscar Hicks		Oklahoma (Muskogee)	
1919-09-26	John Bandzak		Pennsylvania (Farrell)	
1919-08-09	Unidentified man		Massachusetts (Greenfield)	A suspected burglar was killed by a patrolman after the burglar pretended to surrender and allegedly struck the officer.
1919-07-27	William L. Doherty (23)		Rhode Island (Providence)	Doherty reportedly robbed a store along with an accomplice. When he refused to stop after verbal commands were given, an officer fired three shots at the fleeing Doherty, fatally wounding him in the back.
1919-06-30	David Kelly		Massachusetts (Boston)	Kelly was among several men who allegedly assaulted an officer, causing severe injuries. The officer shot Kelly, who died on July 3.
1918-09-26	Gus Kansas		Montana (Butte)	
1918-07-18	Lecil Hilley		Georgia (Danielsville)	
1918-05-27	Unnamed man	Black	Virginia (Norfolk)	
1918-05-08	James. Tilden Mullins		Kentucky (Whitesburg)	
1918-03-24	Stephe Ivenoff		Oklahoma (Tulsa)	
1918-03-24	Joseph Sring		Oklahoma (Tulsa)	
1917-10-15	John A. Scott (40)		South Carolina (Columbia)	
1915-09-03	James Harman		Massachusetts (Hingham)	
1915-08-14	George Kloskowski (18)		Nebraska (Lincoln)	
1915-07-06	Peter Goodmiller (18)		New York (Brooklyn)	
1915-12-18	Frank Hohl		Ohio (Cincinnati)	
1914-03-09	Bradley Wilson	Black	Indiana (Evansville)	
1913-12-02	Claud Lewis		Indiana (Indianapolis)	
1913-12-02	Unnamed man		Indiana (Indianapolis)	
1913-11-19	Gaines, John (50)		Texas (Austin)	Gaines, the only Black officer in the Austin Police Department, was shot and killed by a deputy constable while calling for other officers. The constable had been reported for making a disturbance, and at the time Black officers were not allowed to arrest White subjects.
1913-11-29	Unnamed man		New York (New York City)	A policeman killed a gunman after a foot chase.
1913-11-06	Albert Preston (30)		Colorado (Denver)	
1913-10-23	Antonio Dusmaska		Pennsylvania (Kittanning)	
1913-06-17	Ralph Shea (25)		Massachusetts (Boston)	Shea, who was under arrest for public intoxication, allegedly broke free from Patrolman Charles W. Miller's grip and assaulted the officer, also stealing his club. Miller fired one shot at Shea, fatally wounding him. Miller was charged with manslaughter, but was acquitted after a 1914 trial.
1913-04-06	Leonard Smith (17)		South Carolina (Greeneville)	
1913-04-06	Rowley Martin (20)		South Carolina (Greeneville)	
1912-12-31	Unnamed man	Black	Kentucky (Kuttawa)	A man went on a shooting spree in the towns of Fredonia and Kuttawa before he was killed by marshal William McCullom while resisting arrest.
1912-03-26	Unnamed man		Illinois (Rock Island)	
1912-03-26	Unnamed man		Illinois (Rock Island)	
1912-03-26	Unnamed man		Illinois (Rock Island)	
1911-10-07	Elmer McCurdy (31)	White	Osage Hills, Oklahoma	McCurdy, suspected of robbing a train three days before, was fatally shot in the chest during a shootout with three sheriff's deputies on a ranch.
1911-07-20	Martinus		Oregon (Lakeview)	
1910-07-31	Jim Ross	Black	Mississippi (Biloxi)	
1910-07-10	William F. Deegan (22)		Massachusetts (Boston)	A patrolman arrested Deegan for public intoxication before several people allegedly assaulted him in an attempt to free Deegan. After the officer said he brandished his revolver and gave a warning, he fired several shots into the crowd, wounding four people, including Deegan, who died the following day. The three other wounded were arrested for attempting to free a detainee.
1910-05-20	John Dubinski		Illinois	Dubinski was shot and killed while running away from four men who commanded him to stop walking. The men were later revealed to be plainclothes officers who thought he could be a robber.
1910-01-05	Jack Jackson	Black	South Carolina (Sumter)	
1910-01-04	Unnamed man		Illinois (Chicago)	
1910-01-01	Frank Quigg		Oklahoma (Guthrie)	
1910-01-01	Frank Carpenter		Oklahoma (Guthrie)	

== See also ==
- Death in custody § United States
- Henry A. Wallace Police Crime Public Database
- List of cases of police brutality
- List of countries with annual rates and counts for killings by law enforcement officers
- List of law enforcement officers killed in the line of duty in the United States
- List of law enforcement officers convicted for an on-duty killing in the United States
- List of shootings by US immigration agents
- List of police reforms related to the George Floyd protests
- List of unarmed African Americans killed by law enforcement officers in the United States
- Lists of killings by law enforcement officers
- Police brutality in the United States
- Police misconduct § United States
- Police riot § United States
- Police use of deadly force in the United States
