= List of killings by law enforcement officers in the United States, November 2019 =

This is a list of people reported killed by non-military law enforcement officers in the United States in November 2019, whether in the line of duty or not, and regardless of reason or method. The listing documents the occurrence of a death, making no implications regarding wrongdoing or justification on the part of the person killed or officer involved. Killings are arranged by date of the incident that caused death. Different death dates, if known, are noted in the description. The table below lists 85 people.

== November 2019 ==
Date	Name (age) of the deceased	Race	State (city)	Description
2019-11-30	Eliborio Rodriguez (40)	Hispanic	Eugene, OR	
2019-11-29	Shane S. Swider (46)	Unknown race	Lewes, DE	
2019-11-29	Raymond Lee (54)	White	Modesto, CA	
2019-11-29	Shawn Wilcox	White	Eatonville, WA	
2019-11-29	Keith Alan Bruce (40)	White	Aurora, CO	
2019-11-29	Kenneth Layton (60)	White	Lakeland, FL	
2019-11-28	Derrick Everett (31)	Black	Florida (Tampa)	
2019-11-28	Jeremy Pelican (34)	White	South West Township, MO	
2019-11-28	Gerardo Martinez Ramirez (49)	Hispanic	San Antonio, TX	
2019-11-27	Ward, David (38)		California (Bloomfield)	Ward was pursued by police after being suspected of stealing a car, which was actually his car he had just recovered. Ward and deputies got into a violent struggle, resulting in Ward's death. Ward's death was ruled a homicide.
2019-11-27	Micduff Lamarco Robinson (40)	Black	Mansfield, OH	
2019-11-27	Nicholas J. "Nick" Cantelmi (31)	White	Porter Township, PA	
2019-11-26	Hollis Lewis (51)	White	Greeneville, TN	
2019-11-26	Eric Sopp (48)	White	Parkton, MD	
2019-11-25	Nathaniel Pinnock (22)	Black	Los Angeles, CA	
2019-11-25	Anthony Chilcott (36)	White	Enumclaw, WA	
2019-11-25	Jason Quincey Niccum (42)	White	Great Falls, MT	
2019-11-24	Steven Forrest Saucier (34)	White	Caledonia, MI	
2019-11-23	Estevon Cruz (24)	Hispanic	Pueblo, CO	
2019-11-23	Ariane Lamont McCree (28)	Black	Chester, SC	
2019-11-22	Lance Edward Smith (37)	Black	Elizabethtown, NC	
2019-11-20	Jessica Ann Beedles (42)	White	Los Angeles, CA	
2019-11-20	Paul Emory Cheek (55)	White	Dahlonega, GA	
2019-11-20	Kenneth Simeus (18)	Black	Henderson, NV	
2019-11-20	William Harris (51)	White	Hampton, GA	
2019-11-19	Christopher Terrell Willis (32)	Black	Illinois (Chicago)	
2019-11-19	Jacob Cato (34)	White	Morongo Valley, CA	
2019-11-19	Joel Avery (41)	White	Horn Lake, MS	
2019-11-19	Raul Antonio Menjivar Saabedra (50)	Hispanic	Preston, ID	
2019-11-19	Luis Cardona (38)	Hispanic	Kewaunee, WI	
2019-11-19	Alex Flores (34)	Hispanic	Los Angeles, CA	
2019-11-19	Simba Lion (40)	White	Monroe, MI	
2019-11-18	Cody McClintick (26)	White	Randolph, MO	
2019-11-18	Dante Redmond Jones (28)	Black	Mesa, WA	
2019-11-16	Robert Sikon (41)	White	Carrollton, OH	
2019-11-16	Garrett Ryberg (27)	White	Arizona (Mesa)	
2019-11-16	Andrew Cuevas ()	Hispanic	Lake Elsinore, CA	
2019-11-15	Name Withheld ()	Unknown race	Westborough, MA	
2019-11-15	Treon McCoy (33)	Black	Charlotte, NC	
2019-11-15	Mark Sheppard (27)	Black	Cleveland, OH	
2019-11-14	Kennith Waynon Hooker (52)	White	Beaumont, TX	
2019-11-14	Colin A. C. Wehmeyer (39)	White	Everett, WA	
2019-11-14	Michael A. Jolly (35)	White	Menasha, WI	
2019-11-13	Christopher Blair Ervie (47)	White	Florida (Jacksonville)	
2019-11-13	Roy McAllister (27)	Black	Wilson, NC	
2019-11-13	Omar Enrique Garcia (37)	Hispanic	Los Angeles, CA	
2019-11-13	Martina Standley (35)	Black	Illinois (Chicago)	
2019-11-12	Justin Anderson (39)	White	Yukon, OK	
2019-11-12	Michael Kahalehoe (30)	Native Hawaiian or Pacific Islander	Kapolei, HI	
2019-11-11	Sidney Alexis Renew (20)	White	Lakeland, FL	
2019-11-11	John Luce (22)	White	Lakewood, CO	
2019-11-11	James Aubrey (56)	Unknown race	Cedar City, UT	
2019-11-11	Tammy Pierce (59)	White	Loveland, CO	
2019-11-10	Benjamin Lloyd Cloer (26)	White	Athens, GA	
2019-11-10	Reason, Eric (38)	Black	California (Vallejo)	Off-duty Richmond Police Department Sgt. Virgil Thomas shot and killed Reason at approximately 5:25 p.m. during a dispute between the two men in a retail parking lot on the 500 block of Fairgrounds Drive.
2019-11-10	Lucky Miller (44)	White	Pensacola Beach, FL	
2019-11-09	Ryan D. Hemmingson (44)	Unknown race	Everett, WA	
2019-11-09	Daniel Thomas Childers (28)	White	Union, SC	
2019-11-09	Andrew Joseph Roberts (29)	Unknown race	San Jose, CA	
2019-11-08	Ray Correll (38)	White	Lincolnton, NC	
2019-11-07	Christopher Mills (37)	White	Ashtabula, OH	
2019-11-07	Shelby Gazaway (32)	Black	Louisville, KY	
2019-11-07	Guy Barnard (26)	White	Wadsworth, OH	
2019-11-07	Gerald Newton Allen (66)	White	Conyers, GA	
2019-11-06	Treva Smutherman (31)	Black	Fayetteville, NC	
2019-11-06	Raul Casas Campos (34)	Hispanic	San Antonio, TX	
2019-11-06	Corbin Hunter Jones (20)	White	Henryetta, OK	
2019-11-06	Eddie Ray Maxwell (37)	Black	Tahlequah, OK	
2019-11-05	Maurice Brown (48)	Black	Cleveland, OH	
2019-11-05	Christopher Allan Noe (45)	White	Willis, TX	
2019-11-05	Jay P. Messer (58)	White	La Monte, MO	
2019-11-05	Michael Lee Nguyen (32)	Asian	Sparta, WI	
2019-11-04	Nash Fiske (30)	White	Two Rivers, WI	
2019-11-04	Daniel Munoz (21)	Hispanic	Las Cruces, NM	
2019-11-04	Name Withheld ()	Hispanic	Sunland Park, NM	
2019-11-04	Matthew Rasmussen (31)	White	Arizona (Glendale)	
2019-11-03	Michael Austin (32)	Black	Arizona (Phoenix)	
2019-11-03	Curtis French (56)	White	Parkland, WA	
2019-11-02	John Hale (42)	White	Alma, KY	
2019-11-02	McCree, Ariane (28)	Unknown	South Carolina (Chester)	McCree was shot by officers outside a Walmart
2019-11-01	Luis Fino Nabarrette (38)	Hispanic	Odessa, TX	
2019-11-01	Jose Gallegos (38)	Hispanic	Boulder, CO	
2019-11-01	Michael Kifer (29)	White	Vero Beach, FL	
2019-11-01	Luis Morales-Camacho (41)	Hispanic	Union Park, FL	
2019-11-01	Benjamin Diaz (22)	Hispanic	Alamogordo, NM	

== See also ==
- Death in custody § United States
- Henry A. Wallace Police Crime Public Database
- List of cases of police brutality
- List of countries with annual rates and counts for killings by law enforcement officers
- List of law enforcement officers killed in the line of duty in the United States
- List of law enforcement officers convicted for an on-duty killing in the United States
- List of police reforms related to the George Floyd protests
- List of unarmed African Americans killed by law enforcement officers in the United States
- Lists of killings by law enforcement officers
- Police brutality in the United States
- Police misconduct § United States
- Police riot § United States
- Police use of deadly force in the United States
