= List of killings by law enforcement officers in the United States in the 1970s =

This is a list of people reported killed by non-military law enforcement officers in the United States in the 1970s, whether in the line of duty or not, and regardless of reason or method. The listing documents the occurrence of a death, making no implications regarding wrongdoing or justification on the part of the person killed or officer involved. Killings are arranged by date of the incident that caused death. Different death dates, if known, are noted in the description. This page lists 219 people.

== 1970s ==
The table below lists 219 people.

Date	Name (age) of deceased	State (city)	Description
1979-12-29	William Gavin (39)	California (Los Angeles)	
1979-12-29	James Emil Seidle (26)	California (Madera)	
1979-12-28	Royce Edward Rice (47)	Louisiana (Monroe)	
1979-12-28	James Michael Inmon (27)	Oklahoma (Tulsa)	
1979-12-26	Unnamed man (30s)	New Jersey (Bedminster Township)	
1979-12-26	Unnamed man (20s)	New York (Brooklyn)	
1979-12-25	Mark Sasser (28)	Pennsylvania (Phoenixville)	
1979-12-23	Randy Guerrero (20)	Wisconsin (Milwaukee)	
1979-12-23	Francis John (30)	California (Oakland)	
1979-12-21	Lawrence Riddle (23)	Michigan (Kalamazoo)	
1979-12-20	William Bryant (36)	Maryland (Baltimore)	
1979-12-17	Arthur McDuffie (33)	Florida	Arthur McDuffie was beaten to death by four police officers after a traffic stop.
1979-12-17	Willie Harper (38)	New York (Brooklyn)	
1979-12-15	Unnamed girl (6 weeks old)	South Carolina (Leesville)	
1979-12-14	James J. Kuhl (22)	Montana (Helena)	
1979-12-14	Chuey Bedencourt (32)	South Carolina (Sumter)	
1979-12-13	John Louis Crouch (54)	Texas (Arlington)	
1979-12-13	Melton Ellzey (28)	Louisiana (New Orleans)	
1979-12-11	Unnamed man (20s)	Florida (Fort Lauderdale)	
1979-12-11	Billy Rex Hill (27)	California (Costa Mesa)	
1979-12-10	Raymond Stoepker (35)	New Jersey (Elmwood Park)	
1979-12-09	Dennis Childs (26)	Oklahoma (Bixby)	
1979-12-08	Andrew Collins (55)	Louisiana (Baton Rouge)	
1979-12-08	Clyde Daniel Graham (22)	Illinois (Effingham)	
1979-12-07	Thomas Buntrock	Wisconsin (Mequon)	
1979-12-07	Anthony Johnson (19)	Wisconsin (Mequon)	
1979-12-06	Peter Everrett Roberson (23)	North Carolina (Sanford)	
1979-12-04	Yvette Twillie (27)	Illinois (Chicago)	
1979-12-03	Dennis James Miller (21)	Florida (Lake City)	
1979-12-01	Ted Trenberth (40)	California (South Central Los Angeles)	
1979-11-29	Lawrence Miles (23)	Illinois (Marion)	
1979-11-29	Unnamed man	North Carolina (Raleigh)	
1979-11-26	Robert Rhines (20)	Alaska (Fairbanks)	
1979-11-23	Dennis Warren Newcomb (27)	Virginia (Vinton)	
1979-11-21	Kathleen "Kitty" Norman (23)	New Jersey (Highlands)	
1979-11-20	Unnamed man	New Mexico (Lordsburg)	
1979-11-16	George Farrar Parker Jr. (46)	North Carolina (Charlotte)	
1979-11-16	Gilles Brown Parker (36)	North Carolina (Charlotte)	
1979-11-16	George Farrar Parker III (13)	North Carolina (Charlotte)	
1979-11-13	Javier Sanchez (19)	Texas (San Antonio)	
1979-11-13	Marcellino Gonzalez (34)	New York (Manhattan)	
1979-11-12	Gary M. Gordon (39)	Minnesota (Kasson)	
1979-11-11	Jenaro Barreto (25)	Illinois (Chicago)	
1979-11-06	Unnamed man	Georgia (Macon)	
1979-11-04	Gary McGahan	Ohio (Coshocton)	
1979-11-01	Donald Goodwin (31)	South Carolina (Columbia)	
1979-10-29	Unnamed man	Virginia (Portsmouth)	
1979-10-28	Willie Earl Junor Williams (48)	Florida (Kissimmee)	
1979-10-28	Kyle Hill (18)	New York (Rochester)	
1979-10-28	Edward Harmon (34)	New Jersey (Camden)	
1979-10-26	Claude Lee Willas (32)	Oklahoma (Oklahoma City)	
1979-10-26	Everett Clayton Perks (21)	Ohio (Canton)	
1979-10-25	James Taylor (25)	Michigan (Detroit)	
1979-10-25	Lee Page (36)	Texas (Dallas)	
1979-10-25	Unnamed man	Oklahoma (Oklahoma City)	
1979-10-23	William S. Perron (26)	Connecticut (Bristol)	
1979-10-23	Unnamed man	Washington (Kent)	
1979-10-20	Michael Williams (24)	Louisiana (Shreveport)	
1979-10-18	Sheldon Zink (29)	Michigan (Taylor)	
1979-10-16	Randy Michael Elrod (28)	Oklahoma (Oklahoma City)	
1979-10-15	Unnamed man	New York (Mooers)	
1979-10-14	Morris Gore (39)	New York (Merrick)	
1979-10-14	Charles Jackson (47)	Pennsylvania (Philadelphia)	
1979-10-14 (?)	Roger Raynor	Washington (Seattle)	
1979-10-08	John Michael Germanetti (26)	California (Bakersfield)	
1979-10-07	Willie B. Williams (43)	Louisiana (Shreveport)	
1979-10-07	Michael Bledsoe (16)	Michigan (Detroit)	
1979-10-05	Barry Lee Wolf (22)	Florida (Lake Worth)	
1979-10-05	Bobby Bennett (17)	Michigan (Jackson)	
1979-10-03	Sonny McCadney (17)	Louisiana (New Orleans)	
1979-10-03	George Edward Partin (50s)	Tennessee (Chattanooga)	
1979-09-30	John Marshall (30)	Florida (Coconut Grove)	
1979-09-30	Unnamed man	California (Marina Del Rey)	
1979-09-28	Unnamed man	New York (Brooklyn)	
1979-09-27	Rogelio Romero (4)	Illinois (Chicago)	
1979-09-22	Unnamed man	New Mexico (Belen)	
1979-09-20	Paul Leonard (20)	Florida (Tampa)	
1979-09-19	Gregory Haynes (27)	Indiana (Indianapolis)	
1979-09-19	James Steven Helmes (25)	Missouri (St. Louis)	
1979-09-18 (?)	Michael Young (17)	Michigan (Detroit)	
1979-08-22	Luis Baez (26)	New York (New York City)	Baez, a man with a history of psychological problems, was shot by five officers of the New York City Police Department in his Brooklyn apartment when he lunged at them with a pair of scissors.
1979-03-27	Milton Garrison (32)	Florida (Sarasota)	
1979-03-20	Michael Langdon (24)	Michigan (Detroit)	
1979-03-20	Danny Spelman (31)	Georgia (DeKalb County)	
1979-02-25	Dink Butler (48)	Michigan (Detroit)	
1979-02-24	Unnamed man	New York (Brooklyn)	
1979-02-22	Daniel Edwards (30)	California (Newport Beach)	
1979-02-21	Unnamed man	California (San Diego)	
1979-02-20	Mark Cuttkuhn (16)	Michigan (Pontiac)	
1979-02-12	Unnamed man	Texas (Denton)	
1979-02-06	Fred Wunnenberg (28)	Michigan (Pontiac)	
1979-01-28	Carlos Ruiz (29)	New York (Brooklyn)	
1979-01-27	Unnamed man	New Jersey (Newark)	
1979-01-20	Unnamed man (32)	Florida (North Miami)	
1979-01-20	Unnamed man	Louisiana (Baton Rouge)	
1979-01-18	James Richardson (19)	California (Los Angeles)	
1979-01-18	John Singer (47)	Utah (Coalville)	
1979-01-16	Unnamed man	California (San Diego)	
1979-01-15	Jeffrey Allen Green (17)	Washington (Utah)	
1979-01-14	Stanley Bangs (25)	Louisiana (New Orleans)	
1979-01-14	Michael Lunney (17)	Montana (Butte)	
1979-01-13	Gilbert Milton (38)	Maryland (Baltimore)	
1979-01-08	Richard Parojinog (22)	Maryland (Wheaton)	
1979-01-07	Larry Pence (35)	Ohio (Troy)	
1979-01-04	Sammy Stewart (42)	Texas (Fort Worth)	
1979-01-03	Eula Love (39)	California (Los Angeles)	
1979-01-02	Larry Wayne Alexander (40)	California (Ceres)	
1978-06-20	Donald Wiggins (41)	New York (Brooklyn)	
1978-06-14	Arthur Miller	New York (Brooklyn)	Crown Heights community leader and businessman Arthur Miller was killed by police chokehold.
1978-05-30	Louis De Falco (27)	New York (Queens)	
1978-05-23	Unnamed man	Indiana (Indianapolis)	
1978-02-02	Brian Maggiore	California (Rancho Cordova)	Shot by off-duty police officer and serial killer Joseph James DeAngelo.
1978-02-02	Katie Maggiore	California (Rancho Cordova)	Shot by off-duty police officer and serial killer Joseph James DeAngelo.
1977-11-22	Timothy Mayers (16)	Vermont (Shaftsbury)	
1977-11-05	Daniel M. Cronin (29)	New Jersey (Collingswood)	
1977-10-11	League, Jimmy	Georgia (Monroe)	Shot after leading City officers on a high-speed chase during which he killed two Monroe police officerd, until he was killed by Officer Mike Head.
1977-06-14	Unnamed man	California (Baker)	
1977-05-08	Daniel Rotter (28)	California (San Jose)	
1977-05-07	Unnamed man	New Jersey (Wayne)	
1977-05-05	Torres, Joe Campos	Texas	Joe Campos Torres
1977-02-10	Henry Hill (25)	California (San Francisco)	
1977-02-08	Randall Alan Webster (17)	Texas (Houston)	
1977-02-05	Maurice Kelly (46)	California (Los Angeles)	
1976-10-17	Unnamed man (20s)	California (Riverside)	
1976-09-28	Blanca Lee (26)	New York (Manhattan)	
1976-08-22	Johnny Howard (17)	California (San Francisco)	
1976-07-25	Chester Plummer	Washington, D.C.	Plummer was shot and killed by a Secret Service officer at the White House after ignoring the orders to drop a piece of pipe.
1976-02-08	Larry Edwards (19)	Michigan (Ann Arbor)	Shot fleeing scene of convenience-store robbery. City Council voted not to dismiss two shooting officers but department paid Edwards's mother $15,000 in 1978.
1976-01-12	Eugene Brooks	Arizona (Tucson)	
1976-01-05	Mal Evans	California (Los Angeles)	The former road manager and personal assistant for The Beatles, Evans was shot by police at his home in Los Angeles. Officers were called when his girlfriend phoned the police and told them that Evans was confused and had a gun. The police mistook the air rifle Evans was holding for a rifle and shot him dead.
1975-12-26	Unnamed man	California (Marysville)	
1975-12-12 (?)	Michael O'Leary (26)	Florida (Jacksonville)	
1975-12-02	Bernard Whitehurst	Alabama (Montgomery)	Bernard Whitehurst was shot in the back and killed on December 2, 1975, by Donald Foster, a Montgomery, Alabama police officer who mistakenly thought Whitehurst was the suspect in the robbery of a neighborhood grocery store. There was a police cover-up that included police officers planting a gun on him from the police evidence room.
1975-11-30	Milton Bobo (27)	Michigan (Detroit)	
1975-09-11	Claude Snelling	California (Visalia)	Shot by off-duty police officer and serial killer Joseph James DeAngelo.
1975-06-19	Robert Johnson (23)	Texas (Houston)	
1975-06-18	Frank Pope (25)	Tennessee (Memphis)	
1975-06-13	Jerry Pedigo (24)	Indiana (Indianapolis)	Police killed Pedigo and Barger during an alleged robbery. They also wounded Larry Barger, David's brother.
1975-06-13	David Barger (28)	Indiana (Indianapolis)	Police killed Pedigo and Barger during an alleged robbery. They also wounded Larry Barger, David's brother.
1975-05-26	Patrick William Fitzgerald	Illinois (Crystal Lake)	Fitzgerald and two other teenagers in McHenry County, Illinois initiated a foot pursuit after police were responding to a report of them attempting to break into a bowling alley. Fitzgerald charged at an officer after he fired a warning shot over his head, and a knife with a stiletto blade was found near Fitzgerald's body after he was shot.
1975-05-04	Willie McGrath (31)	Missouri (St. Louis)	
1975-02-28	Darrell Doiron (27)	Louisiana (New Orleans)	
1975-02-02	Thomas Vodicka	New York (Manhattan)	
1975-02-02	Frank Bugdin	New York (Manhattan)	
1975-02-26	Benjamin Davis (16)	Oklahoma (Oklahoma City)	
1975-02-12	Stephen Williams (15)	New York (Bronx)	
1975-02-09	Michael Car	California (Los Angeles)	
1974-12-24	William Connell (30)	New York (Manhattan)	
1974-12-18	William Walker (43)	New York (Queens)	
1974-11-02	Unnamed woman	Maryland (Baltimore)	
1974-10-25	Larry Winstead (21)	Michigan (Detroit)	
1974-09-22	Leon Roberts (27)	Texas (Forth Worth)	
1974-08-29	Avery, Gregory (16)	Florida (Tampa)	
1974-08-22	Davin "Red" Mehard (39)	Texas (Amarillo)	
1974-08-18	Unnamed man (20s)	California (San Francisco)	
1974-08-08	Clyde Renfro	Oklahoma (Vian)	
1974-08-07	Warren Hardy Brown (28)	Maryland (Parkville)	
1974-07-28	Darell T. Toohey (63)	Florida (Jacksonville)	
1974-07-24	Haskell Eugene Brown (47)	Oregon (Springfield)	
1974-07-08	Dan M. Metz	Louisiana (Covington)	COVINGTON, La. (AP) – The father of a 17-year-old youth shot to death by a Covington policeman after an automobile chase on July 8 says 'his attorney will file a suit for the "honor and memory of my son". Clyde Metz of Covington, whose son Dan was lulled by a shotgun blast, announced his plans to sue in the wake of a grand jury report exonerating the policeman of any criminal' wrongdoing. Asst. Dist. Atty. Julian Rodrigue of St. Tammany Parish said the jury heard from about 18 witnesses before making its report. Covington police said the Metz youth's car crashed into a roadblock in a Covington subdivision after a chase through back roads of two parishes.
1974-05-30	William Norman (43)	California (Los Angeles)	
1974-05-27	Hillian Ellbert (23)	Michigan (Detroit)	
1974-02-16	Walter Hebert (54)	California (Costa Mesa)	
1974-02-15	Edward Rettis (28)	California (Costa Mesa)	
1974-01-08	Michael Woods (22)	Ohio (Junction City)	
1974-01-07	Unnamed man (30)	Mississippi (Natchez)	
1973-11-25	Unnamed man	Minnesota (St. Paul)	
1973-11-12	Robert Kocok (18)	Florida (Miami)	
1973-11-08	George Lenton Whitfield (32)	Georgia (Atlanta)	
1973-11-05	Patricia Rovansek (32)	Ohio (Cleveland)	
1973-11-05	Kimberly Rovansek (7)	Ohio (Cleveland)	
1973-11-05	Cyril Rovansek III (8)	Ohio (Cleveland)	
1973-11-05	Jerry Diloreto (46)	Ohio (Cleveland)	
1973-11-05	Shirley Diloreto (39)	Ohio (Cleveland)	
1973-11-05	Linda Diloreto (5)	Ohio (Cleveland)	
1973-11-05	Michael Diloreto (5)	Ohio (Cleveland)	
1973-10-17	Redro Bissonette	South Dakota (Pine Ridge)	
1973-10-07	Craig Krumbah (24)	Washington (Tacoma)	
1973-07-24	Santos Rodriguez (11)	Texas (Dallas)	Murder of Santos Rodriguez
1973-06-28	James Mathieson (27)	Virginia (Alexandria)	
1973-05-16	Kelley Anderson (60s)	South Carolina (Greenwood)	
1973-05-15	William H. Abernathy (25)	Oregon (Portland)	
1973-04-22	Johnnie Thomas	Georgia (Atlanta)	
1973-04-22	William Bonner	California (Los Angeles)	
1973-03-	Robert Hoyt (24)	Michigan (Detroit)	
1973-01-30	James Collier (56)	Texas (Texarkana)	
1973-01-07	Mark Essex	Louisiana (New Orleans)	Essex was fatally shot over 200 times by policeman abroad a CH-46 helicopter and police sharpshooters after he killed multiple people at a Howard Johnson's hotel in Downtown New Orleans.
1972-12-13	Donald Denver Denton (21)	Kansas (Olathe)	
1972-12-06	Larry Lee Minerd (31)	Georgia (Atlanta)	
1972-12-03	Marketia Fouse (16)	California (Compton)	
1972-11-26	Richard Lee Disckill (22)	California (Corona)	
1972-11-09	George Whitfield (31)	Georgia (Atlanta)	
1972-11-08	Fred Emanuel (46)	Illinois (Chicago)	
1972-11-07	William Bailey (22)	Illinois (Chicago)	
1972-08-28	Luther Williams (33)	Ohio (Dayton)	
1972-06-20	Raymond Galliam (49)	Florida (Jacksonville)	
1972-05-29	John R. Mosely (41)	New York (Buffalo)	
1972-05-06	Don Rickets (19)	California (Modesto)	
1972-05-01	Mary Lou Hawkins (57)	Mississippi (Shaw)	
1972-03-07	Sam Torres	California (El Monte)	
1971-11-20	Filemino Rosario	New York (Manhattan)	Two foot patrolmen met Rosario near Lexington Avenue and East 122nd Street running and waving a gun. After they identified themselves as police officers, Rosario pointed his gun at them and pulled the trigger twice. The gun misfired both times. One of the officers then shot Rosario five times in the chest.
1971-09-19	John H. Smith (37)	California (San Jose)	
1971-06-22	Ernest Williams (19)	Pennsylvania (Pittsburgh)	
1971-06-21	Willie J. Osborne (20)	Georgia (Columbus)	
1971-05-24	Leon Anderson (22)	Tennessee (Chattanooga)	
1971-05-18	Rudy Simms	New York (Brooklyn)	
1971-05-14	William Nagy	Ohio (Cleveland)	
1971-05-14	Sidney Means (21)	Ohio (Cleveland)	
1971-04-30	Ronald Legault (15)	California (Newark)	
1971-04-03	Thoman Hakaim (35)	Ohio (Cleveland)	
1971-01-18	Jerry Taylor (22)	Texas (Dallas)	
1970-11-27	Donald Perry (32)	Ohio (Greene)	
1970-11-12	Yeoman Lyles (43)	New York (Buffalo)	
1970-10-19	Ronald Boddie (22)	Michigan (Detroit)	
1970-07-06	Emmie Mosley (28)	Florida (Miami)	
1970-05-27	Maurice O'Neal (31)	Texas (Houston)	
1970-05-14	Phillip Lafayette Gibbs (21)	Mississippi (Jackson)	Jackson State killings
1970-05-14	James Earl Green (17)	Mississippi (Jackson)	Jackson State killings
1970-03-17	Alfred McKnight (32)	Illinois (Park Forest)	
