= Killing of Deborah Danner =

Shooting death in 2016 in New York City

- Date: October 18, 2016
- Time: 6:00 p.m.
- Location: 630 Pugsley Avenue, Castle Hill, Bronx, New York City, New York, U.S.
- Type: Homicide by shooting, police killing
- Participants: Sgt. Hugh Barry
- Deaths: Deborah Danner
- Accused: Hugh Barry
- Charges: Second-degree murder; Manslaughter; Criminally negligent homicide
- Verdict: Not guilty on all counts

Deborah Danner, 66, was fatally shot by New York City Police Department Sgt. Hugh Barry on October 18, 2016, in her home in the Bronx, New York. According to police sources, she was armed with first a pair of scissors and then a baseball bat. According to an emergency medical technician, she had put the scissors down, but later picked up a baseball bat. Barry was charged with murder and manslaughter in May 2017. He was acquitted in February 2018.

On October 18, 2016, a neighbor called 911 at 6:05 p.m. and reported that Danner was erratic. Police had been called to her apartment before. According to the police, Danner had scissors, and Barry talked her into putting them down. Barry claims that she then picked up a baseball bat and swung at him. Barry shot Danner twice, fatally wounding her. He was the only officer in the bedroom, although others were on the scene.

According to court testimony by Brittney Mullings, an emergency medical technician, Mullings had arrived before Barry. Danner had put down the scissors and Mullings was talking to her. Danner was not holding anything in her hands. Mullings was trying to explain to Danner why they had arrived. Barry then arrived and did not talk to Mullings or Danner. The police interrupted their conversation, and Danner retreated into her bedroom. Six police officers followed Danner into her bedroom, and a minute later, Mullings heard two shots.

== Background ==
Danner had schizophrenia and had written an essay, "Living With Schizophrenia", in 2012. She specifically cited deadly interactions between police and people with mental illnesses as problematic and made recommendations to help prevent them. Toward the end, she wrote "It has never been lost on me that the old adage, 'There but by the grace of God, go I' could as easily apply to me".

She was a parishioner who regularly attended the Cathedral of St. John the Divine and Trinity Church Wall Street, and was active in that community's groups and ministries. A memorial service was held for her at St. John the Divine.

== Aftermath ==
Less than six hours after the death, Sergeant Barry was placed on administrative duty and stripped of his badge and gun. According to The New York Times, "Mayor Bill de Blasio said at a news conference that the sergeant had not followed training or protocols for dealing with those with mental illness, and for some reason had neither used his Taser nor waited for specialized officers trained to deal with such situations."

The death of Danner, who was black, spurred a protest on October 19. Protestors marched from her apartment building to the 43rd Precinct station house. Marchers included members of the New York Black Lives Matter chapter.

Barry was arrested and charged with second-degree murder on May 31, 2017. Bronx County District Attorney, Darcel D. Clark's prosecution of Barry ultimately lead to an acquittal on all charges by a bench trial. On February 14, 2018, Barry was acquitted by Judge Robert A. Neary.
