= List of killings by law enforcement officers in the United States, October 2017 =

This is a list of people reported killed by non-military law enforcement officers in the United States in October 2017, whether in the line of duty or not, and regardless of reason or method. The listing documents the occurrence of a death, making no implications regarding wrongdoing or justification on the part of the person killed or officer involved. Killings are arranged by date of the incident that caused death. Different death dates, if known, are noted in the description. The table below lists 94 people.

== October 2017 ==
Date	Name (age) of deceased	Race	State (city)	Description
2017-10-31	Vincent Jewan Hall (22)	Black	Texas (Arlington)	
2017-10-31	Jesus Birelas-Contreras (25)	Hispanic	California (Sunnyvale)	
2017-10-31	Luvelle Kennon (27)	Black	California (Riverside)	
2017-10-31	Heather Denean Bubrig (37)	White	New Mexico (Las Cruces)	
2017-10-31	Paul Landis Gorden (39)	White	Tennessee (Livingston)	
2017-10-30	Robert James Lightfeather (33)	Native American	Washington (Federal Way)	Police were called after reports of a man threatening two others with a gun. Lightfeather reportedly raised his gun at police when the responded. Police fired on his, killing him.
2017-10-30	Dante Holden (19)	Black	New Jersey (Newark)	
2017-10-30	Tymyr Wilson (21)	Black	New Jersey (Newark)	
2017-10-29	Brandon Lee Flowers (41)	White	Indiana (New Castle)	
2017-10-29	Kalin Jackson (23)	Black	Pennsylvania (King of Prussia)	
2017-10-29	Eric Higgs (46)	Black	Mississippi (Senatobia)	
2017-10-29	Mark Bidon (50)	White	Colorado (Englewood)	
2017-10-28	Danny Sanchez (40)	Hispanic	Colorado (Greeley)	
2017-10-28	Lucas De Ford (27)	Native American	Wisconsin (Black River Falls)	
2017-10-28	Baltazar Escaloma-Baez (17)	Hispanic	Oregon (Grand Ronde)	
2017-10-27	Charles L. Wallace (46)	White	Pennsylvania (Erie)	
2017-10-27	Jerry Richardson (47)	Black	Florida (Indiantown)	
2017-10-26	James M. Davis (34)	White	New York (Horseheads)	
2017-10-26	Sanders Surber (32)	White	Alabama (Fairhope)	
2017-10-25	Timothy Earl Jackson (33)	Black	Florida (St. Petersburg)	
2017-10-25	Antonio Levison (33)	Black	Ohio (Cleveland)	
2017-10-24	Sean Bohinski (37)	White	Pennsylvania (Nanticoke)	
2017-10-24	David Campos (34)	Hispanic	Texas (Bellaire)	
2017-10-23	Matthew David Palaita (35)	Hispanic	California (Lodi)	
2017-10-23	George Gipp (35)	Native American	North Dakota (Fort Yates)	
2017-10-23	Ashleigh Bertucci (31)	White	Kentucky (Shelbyville)	
2017-10-23	Darius Miller Jr. (20)	Black	Maryland (Baltimore)	
2017-10-22	Johnny Bonta (43)	Native American	Nevada (Sparks)	
2017-10-22	Dexter David Anthony Baxter (30)	Native American	Wisconsin (Crandon)	
2017-10-22	Nicholas Adam Pimentel (27)	Hispanic	California (Modesto)	
2017-10-22	Samantha “Baby Girl” Hennard (25)	White	Missouri (St. Joseph)	Police responded to a report of a stolen vehicle and pursued two suspects on foot. One of them, Hennard, turned and shot at officers, who returned fire.
2017-10-21	Jason Daniel Marble (37)	White	Ohio (Girard)	
2017-10-21	Victor Gonzalez Gonzalez (44)	Hispanic	California (Cloverdale)	
2017-10-20	Jamarco McShann (23)	Black	Ohio (Moraine)	
2017-10-20	Armando Frank (44)	Black	Louisiana (Markville)	Frank was sitting on his tractor in a parking lot when sheriff’s deputies came to him and ordered him off, saying they had a warrant for his arrest (on trespassing). Frank asked to see the warrant, which the deputies did not have with them. They continued to demand, he continued to refuse. The deputies then dragged Frank off the tractor. One put him in a chokehold for several minutes, asphyxiating Frank. (One of the deputies shot a Taser at the other during the arrest.)
2017-10-20	Dewboy Lister (55)	Black	Texas (Corpus Christi)	
2017-10-20	Phillip Joel Trammell (30)	White	Oklahoma (Muldrow)	
2017-10-20	Jorge Cabrera (54)	Hispanic	Texas (Houston)	
2017-10-20	Dusharn Weems (23)	Black	Florida (Tampa)	
2017-10-19	Matthew Alan Whitley (26)	White	North Carolina (Kings Mountain)	
2017-10-19	Steven Wayne Truex (38)	White	Alabama (Birmingham)	
2017-10-19	Mitchell Fox (34)	White	Florida (Clearwater)	
2017-10-18	Daniel Spear (35)	White	Arizona (Tucson)	
2017-10-17	Ezekiel Juan Duran (18)	Hispanic	California (Atwater)	
2017-10-17	DeAndre Bethea (24)	Black	Virginia (Hampton)	
2017-10-16	James Michael Chappell (32)	White	South Carolina (Simpsonville)	
2017-10-16	Eric Garrison (20)	Black	Maryland (Baltimore)	Garrison robbed a 7-11 gas station with a shotgun. As he exited the store he was confronted by an officer who just arrived to the scene, and was shot and killed.
2017-10-16	Luis David Flores (34)	Hispanic	Arizona (Tucson)	
2017-10-16	Joshua Clayton Johnson (31)	White	Texas (Kingwood)	
2017-10-14	Kristopher Birtcher	White	California (San Marcos)	
2017-10-14	Michael David Lopez (44)	Hispanic	California (Torrance)	
2017-10-14	Paul Eric Dolen (57)	White	Kentucky (Monticello)	
2017-10-13	Eddie Sanders (25)	White	California (Olivehurst)	
2017-10-13	J.C. Hawkins Jr. (42)	Black	Virginia (Charlottesville)	
2017-10-12	John Robert Payne (35)	Black	Alabama (Birmingham)	
2017-10-12	Sean D. Brady (29)	White	Arizona (Flagstaff)	
2017-10-11	Brandon Wade Rucker (43)	Hispanic	Arizona (Marana)	
2017-10-11	Kristian Martinez (44)	Hispanic	Colorado (Trinidad)	
2017-10-11	Vincent J. Dronet (61)	White	Mississippi (Biloxi)	
2017-10-10	Daniel James (55)	Unknown	Washington (Rochester)	James was shot after exiting his vehicle with a weapon and approaching police. Police were responding to reports of a man acting erratically and armed with a pistol.
2017-10-08	Roberto Avendano	Hispanic	Virginia (Abingdon)	
2017-10-08	Glenn Southwood Jr. (46)	White	Arizona (Lakeside)	
2017-10-08	Albert Garcia ()	Hispanic	California (San Fernando)	
2017-10-08	Regina Twist (36)	White	Arkansas (Springfield)	
2017-10-08	Cariann Denise Hithon (22)	Black	Florida (Miami Beach)	
2017-10-08	Corey Antonio Boykin Jr. (24)	Black	Kentucky (Louisville)	
2017-10-07	Samuel David Lanham (25)	White	West Virginia (Charleston)	
2017-10-07	James Hartsfield (28)	Black	Arkansas (Little Rock)	
2017-10-07	Sabrina Ann Garcia (34)	Hispanic	Arizona (Mesa)	
2017-10-07	Scott Anello (61)	Unknown race	Missouri (St. Louis)	
2017-10-06	Robert Callejas (35)	Hispanic	Florida (Orlando)	
2017-10-06	Ernesto Padron (52)	Hispanic	Florida (Miami)	
2017-10-06	Garrett Hoose (47)	White	Pennsylvania (Perryopolis)	
2017-10-06	Matthew Jonathan Luis Hurtado (28)	Hispanic	California (Duarte)	
2017-10-06	Dale Sisson (51)	White	Colorado (Golden)	
2017-10-06	Steven P. Myers (42)	White	Kansas (Sun City)	
2017-10-05	Brandon Lee Bohanan (35)	White	Georgia (Hiram)	
2017-10-05	Johnny Roy Stokes Jr. (40)	White	Alabama (Leeds)	
2017-10-05	German Ornelas (31)	Hispanic	Texas (Brownsville)	
2017-10-05	Phumee Lee (28)	Asian	Minnesota (St. Paul)	
2017-10-05	Cristino Umana-Garcia (29)	Hispanic	Kansas (Garden City)	
2017-10-04	Chad W. Cochell (34)	White	Washington (Spokane)	
2017-10-04	Jomekia Turner (37)	Black	Georgia (Thomasville)	
2017-10-04	Michael Ferrell (67)	White	Arizona (Mesa)	
2017-10-04	Sandra "Sandy" Guardiola (48)	Black	New York (Canandaigua)	Guardiola, an off-duty parole officer, was killed by police performing a wellness check on her.
2017-10-03	John Loaiza (40)	White	Missouri (Jefferson City)	
2017-10-02	Marquinton T. Brooks (22)	Black	Louisiana (West Monroe)	
2017-10-01	Joshua Lanflisi (38)	White	Missouri (St. Louis)	
2017-10-01	Lester Machado (24)	Hispanic	Florida (Miami)	
2017-10-01	Micah McComas (41)	White	Alaska (Seward)	McComas was stopped for a traffic violation that turned into a drug investigation. Police put McComas in the back of a patrol car; he got into the front and attempted to drive away, when police shot him.
2017-10-01	Kevin Anthony Battaglia (33)	White	North Carolina (Parkton)	
2017-10-01	George Randall Newman (26)	White	Colorado (Fort Collins)	
2017-10-01	Anthony Edward Gallo (34)	White	Pennsylvania (Washington)	
2017-10-01	Marquis "Bubba" Jones (27)	Black	Iowa (Burlington)	

== See also ==
- Death in custody § United States
- Henry A. Wallace Police Crime Public Database
- List of cases of police brutality
- List of countries with annual rates and counts for killings by law enforcement officers
- List of law enforcement officers killed in the line of duty in the United States
- List of law enforcement officers convicted for an on-duty killing in the United States
- List of shootings by US immigration agents
- List of police reforms related to the George Floyd protests
- List of unarmed African Americans killed by law enforcement officers in the United States
- Lists of killings by law enforcement officers
- Police brutality in the United States
- Police misconduct § United States
- Police riot § United States
- Police use of deadly force in the United States
