= List of killings by law enforcement officers in the United States, August 2016 =

This is a list of people reported killed by non-military law enforcement officers in the United States in August 2016, whether in the line of duty or not, and regardless of reason or method. The listing documents the occurrence of a death, making no implications regarding wrongdoing or justification on the part of the person killed or officer involved. Killings are arranged by date of the incident that caused death. Different death dates, if known, are noted in the description. The table below lists 97 people.

== August 2016 ==
Date	Name (age) of deceased	Race	State (city)	Description
2016-08-31	Michael Ferguson (21)	White	Colorado (Denver)	Ferguson was shot to death as three officers tried to arrest him on a felony warrant. He had allegedly tried to grab an officer's gun.
2016-08-31	Thomas E. Sekscinski (38)	White	Missouri (Verona)	An officer fatally shot Sekscinski after a high-speed pursuit. The pursuit began because the license plate did not match the type of car it was registered to. The officer chased him outside city limits and killed the unarmed man. The officer had to pay $150,000 in damages to Sekscinski's family in a wrongful death suit.
2016-08-30	Justin Christopher Baker (36)	White	Washington (Graham)	Baker's mother called police to say her son was attempting to break into her home while armed with a chainsaw. Deputies unsuccessfully attempt to subdue him with a stun gun, then shot him after he charged at them with the chainsaw.
2016-08-30	James Robert Richards (28)	Native American	Alaska (Fairbanks)	Richards allegedly threatened people with a gun, fled from police, and took a hostage before being fatally shot by police.
2016-08-30	Levonia Riggins (22)	Black	Florida (Tampa)	Riggins, an unarmed Black man, was shot and killed in his home by a white deputy. He was asleep when a SWAT team entered his home looking for two grams of marijuana. His death was ruled justified by police, which caused protests in the Tampa area.
2016-08-30	Lyle Patrick Blanchard (59)	White	Texas (Harker Heights)	
2016-08-30	Gregory Mathis (36)	White	Texas (Weatherford)	
2016-08-29	Paula Phillips (35)	White	Arizona (Kingman)	
2016-08-29	Michael Peacor (56)	White	California (San Bernardino)	
2016-08-29	Jaqwan Julius Terry (24)	Black	North Carolina (Raleigh)	
2016-08-28	Justin Kulhanek-Derks (37)	White	Minnesota (Eagan)	
2016-08-27	Angel Torres Jr. (26)	Hispanic	Arizona (Pnoenix)	
2016-08-27	Terry Lee Salazar (49)	Hispanic	Colorado (Denver)	
2016-08-27	Alfred Toe (34)	Black	New Jersey (Trenton)	
2016-08-27	Darrel Hetrick (82)	White	West Virginia (Morgantown)	
2016-08-26	Matthew Gibbon (41)	White	Nevada (Las Vegas)	
2016-08-25	David Coborubio (32)	Hispanic	California (Compton)	
2016-08-25	Michael W. Gaskill (63)	White	Oregon (Redmond)	
2016-08-25	Donta Taylor (31)	Black	California (Compton)	
2016-08-25	Jerry Lee Jackson (63)	Unknown race	Colorado (Fort Collins)	
2016-08-24	William Charbonneau (43)	White	Florida (Orlando)	
2016-08-24	Jeffrey Darren Hosea (53)	White	Tennessee (Shelbyville)	
2016-08-24	Elias Portillo (36)	Hispanic	Texas (Dallas)	
2016-08-23	Bobby Lyn Buck (49)	White	Texas (Myra)	
2016-08-22	Kelley Brandon Forte (34)	Black	Ohio (Hamilton)	
2016-08-21	Bernie Porche (37)	Black	Louisiana (New Orleans)	
2016-08-21	Juan Gabriel Torres (36)	Hispanic	New Mexico (Las Cruces)	
2016-08-21	Brandon Coles (25)	Black	Virginia (Dinwiddie)	
2016-08-20	Pedro Montanez (71)	Hispanic	Arizona (Phoenix)	
2016-08-19	Marcelo Luna (47)	Hispanic	California (Los Angeles)	
2016-08-19	Kyle Zimbelman (29)	White	Nevada (Reno)	
2016-08-19	Todd P. Browning (54)	White	Tennessee (Chattanooga)	
2016-08-19	Kole B. Knight (31)	White	Wisconsin (New Londom)	
2016-08-19	Daniel Kevin Harris (29)	White	North Carolina (Charlotte)	Harris was shot upon exiting his vehicle after an officer followed him for 10 miles for speeding. Harris was deaf.
2016-08-19	Jorge Ceniceros (22)	Hispanic	Arizona (Phoenix)	
2016-08-18	Silivenusi Pacelli Namato Ravono (46)	Asian	California (Greenbrae)	
2016-08-18	Chad Irwin (40)	White	California (Citrus Heights)	
2016-08-18	David Alan Fulton (59)	White	California (McKinleyville)	
2016-08-18	Francisco Villarreal (37)	Hispanic	California (Bakersfield)	
2016-08-18	Trenton Lohman (38)	White	California (Poway)	
2016-08-18	David Klassen (29)	White	New Mexico (Ruidoso)	
2016-08-18	Joseph Nathaniel Weber (36)	White	Kansas (Hays)	
2016-08-17	Omer Ismail Ali (27)	Black	Washington (Kelso)	
2016-08-16	Larry Eugene Kurtley Jr. (53)	White	Arizona (Apache Junction)	
2016-08-16	Marcos Antonio Gastelum (25)	Hispanic	Arizona (Tucson)	
2016-08-16	Colby Friday (30)	Black	California (Stockton)	
2016-08-16	Kenney Watkins (18)	Black	California (Los Angeles)	
2016-08-16	Carl Nivins (32)	White	North Carolina (Lenoir)	
2016-08-16	Michael Scott Martin (36)	White	Ohio (Rome)	
2016-08-16	John O'Handley (55)	White	West Virginia (Augusta)	
2016-08-15	Danny Pirtle (42)	White	Tennessee (Counce)	
2016-08-15	Jovany Martinez (29)	Hispanic	Virginia (Falls Church)	
2016-08-13	Ruben Horacio Strand (38)	Hispanic	Arizona (Phoenix)	
2016-08-13	Eric Ortega Soto (36)	Hispanic	California (Hayward)	
2016-08-13	Perry Lee Heitman (53)	White	Colorado (Lakewood)	
2016-08-13	Dominic Neal (30)		New Jersey (Hamilton)	
2016-08-13	Smith, Sylville (23)	Black	Wisconsin (Milwaukee)	Smith was shot by a police officer while fleeing and armed with a handgun. The shooting sparked riots that left several people injured and buildings and cars damaged. Dominique Heaggan-Brown, an ex-Milwaukee police officer, was charged with reckless homicide in the shooting death of Smith.
2016-08-13	Kendrick Brown (18)	Black	Arkansas (Monticello)	
2016-08-12	Mistie Reynolds (33)	White	Florida (Kissimmee)	
2016-08-12	Dominic Fontana Rollice (49)	White	Oklahoma (Tahlequah)	Rollice was shot after lunging at police with a hammer while they were responding to a call for disturbing the peace.
2016-08-12	Jesus Armando Carillo (22)	Hispanic	Arizona (Mesa)	
2016-08-11	Sergio Weick (33)	Hispanic	California (Vista)	
2016-08-11	Mark Sawaf (39)	White	Kentucky (Harlan)	
2016-08-11	Jeffrey J. Martelli (59)	White	Washington (Tukwila)	
2016-08-11	Tommy Seneca (54)	White	Louisiana (Plaquemine)	
2016-08-10	Tony Timpa (32)	White	Texas (Dallas)	Dallas Police killed Tony Timpa, a white, 32-year-old resident. Timpa, suffering a mental health crisis, was already handcuffed while a group of officers pressed his prone body into the ground for 14 minutes, while he squirmed. The grand jury indicted the officers but the district attorney declined to prosecute.
2016-08-09	Mary Knowlton (73)	White	Florida (Punta Gorda)	Accidentally shot during a role-playing demonstration. An officer was playing the role of a criminal and shot Knowlton with a gun that was thought to only contain blanks, but instead contained live rounds.
2016-08-09	Jesse James Romero (14)	Hispanic	California (Los Angeles)	
2016-08-09	Wally Camara		New York (Bronx)	
2016-08-09	Ronald Smith (45)	White	Ohio (Mt. Sterling)	
2016-08-09	Jeffrey Allen Morris (44)	White	South Carolina (Piedmont)	
2016-08-08	Michael McClurg (56)	White	California (Citrus Heights)	
2016-08-08	Juan J. Godines (34)	Hispanic	Kentucky (Georgetown)	
2016-08-08	Darnell Wicker (57)	Black	Kentucky (Louisville)	
2016-08-08	James Eugene Burgess (64)	White	North Carolina (Wilkesboro)	
2016-08-08	James Jennings Jr. (69)	White	South Carolina (Little Mountain)	
2016-08-07	Jawari Porter (25)	Black	Ohio (Cincinnati)	
2016-08-07	Earl "Shaleek" Pinckney (20)	Black	Pennsylvania (Harrisburg)	
2016-08-05	Jamarion Robinson (26)	Black	Georgia (East Point)	Robinson's mother called for a mental health check on Robinson after an incident in the family home. Officers attempted to arrest Robinson via a no-knock-warrant and opened fire when they believed they saw Robinson approach with a gun in hand. After Robinson was declared deceased officers handcuffed his hands behind his back, though no officers were injured during the arrest. The incident was filmed by a neighbor.
2016-08-05	David Michael Moya (31)	Hispanic	California (Sauntee)	
2016-08-05	Ronald Robbibaro (30)	White	Florida (Spring Hill)	
2016-08-05	Johannes M. Wood (58)	White	Virginia (Aldie)	
2016-08-05	James A. Quealy (59)	White	Wisconsin (Beaver Dam)	
2016-08-04	Marcus Sexton (22)	Hispanic	Arkansas (Little Rock)	
2016-08-04	E.J. Walters Jr. (69)	White	Virginia (Gate City)	
2016-08-03	Bradley Carey (54)	White	Michigan (Detroit)	
2016-08-03	Benjamin William Heaton (31)	White	Utah (Clearfield)	
2016-08-02	Demarco Newman (43)	Black	Florida (Palm Bay)	
2016-08-02	Matthew David Conrad (34)	White	Idaho (Hammett)	
2016-08-02	William Bowers (51)	White	California (Castaic)	A Los Angeles County sheriff's deputy fatally shot William Bowers, an unarmed homeless man, after deputies tried to stop and question him.
2016-08-02	Adam Jo Klimek (31)	White	Minnesota (Alexandria)	
2016-08-02	Richard Lance London (22)	White	South Carolina (Lake City)	
2016-08-01	Richard Gene Swihart (32)	Black	California (Santa Ana)	
2016-08-01	Korryn Gaines (23)	Black	Maryland (Randallstown)	Gaines was shot dead after an hours-long standoff during which Gaines threatened police with a shotgun. Police had attempted to serve Gaines an outstanding warrant issued for an earlier traffic violation.
2016-08-01	Bryan N. Byrd (43)	White	South Carolina (Lexington)	
2016-08-01	Kenneth Eugene Bonanno (67)	White	Virginia (Fredericksburg)	
2016-08-01	Manuel De La Cruz (26)	Hispanic	Texas (Port Arthur)	
