= List of killings by law enforcement officers in the United States, August 2012 =

This is a list of people reported killed by non-military law enforcement officers in the United States in August 2012, whether in the line of duty or not, and regardless of reason or method. The listing documents the occurrence of a death, making no implications regarding wrongdoing or justification on the part of the person killed or officer involved. Killings are arranged by date of the incident that caused death. Different death dates, if known, are noted in the description. The table below lists 90 people.

== August 2012 ==
Date	Name (Age) of Deceased	State (City)	Description
2012-08-31	Allen, Michael Vincent (25)	Texas (Mesquite)	Officers attempted to stop a vehicle that matched the description of vehicle that had been involved in a previous chase. Allen led officers on a 30-minute chase that reached speeds of 100 mph. Allen turned into a cul-de-sac and an officer rammed his squad car into Allen's truck. According to a witness, the police yelled "Get out" then began shooting without giving Allen a chance to comply. Allen was unarmed. A single officer fired his weapon 41 times, requiring two reloads to do so. In November 2013, officer Patrick Tuter, who shot Allen, was charged with manslaughter.
2012-08-31	Gavin, Prince Jamel (29)	Washington (Tacoma)	Officers were responding to a domestic violence call, and when they arrived Gavin got out of a truck and ran towards the house. At some point he turned, causing an officer to feel threatened, shooting him to death. Investigators allegedly found a gun near Gavin's body. This incident is that officer's second shooting in his 5-year career.
2012-08-31	Henderson, Mark (19)	Minnesota (Woodbury)	At a Red Roof Inn, Henderson was shot multiple times by three officers when they thought he was armed and non-compliant. Police say they did not find a weapon on Henderson's body. Another man allegedly was armed and ended up holding people hostage; a SWAT team was able to negotiate a surrender and he was taken into custody.
2012-08-30	Anderson, Willie (54)	Missouri (St. Louis)	Shot by officers after allegedly advancing on them with a machete.
2012-08-30	Leatherwood, Paul (47)	South Carolina (Anderson)	Officers responding to a domestic violence call entered the home. Leatherwood allegedly pointed a weapon at the officers; at least one of the officers opened fire. Leatherwood was hit and killed.
2012-08-29	Pollard, Myron (18)	Missouri (St. Louis)	Pollard was shot by an ATF agent and died the following morning. The ATF and local police were attempting to arrest Pollard and four others following a multi-week investigation.
2012-08-29	unnamed male	California (Carson)	A suspect was shot by an officer and died later at a hospital.
2012-08-29	Valdez III, Edward (21)	Colorado (Pueblo)	Police say a man on a bicycle was shooting out car windows with a BB gun early in the morning. When an officer approached the man, he allegedly fired at an officer, striking him, and the officer shot him to death.
2012-08-28	Haney, Gary (40)	Colorado (Denver)	Officers attempted to arrest Haney who was wanted on two nation-wide warrants. Haney threatened that they only way he would be taken from the hotel was in a body bag. Haney raised a tool, configured in the shape of a gun, and raised it in a threatening manner. He was shot by three officers with five rounds.
2012-08-28	Prine, Deborah (42)	Louisiana (Reserve)	A man and woman were shot and killed during an altercation with police at a trailer park. Police say they were armed. This incident occurred during Hurricane Isaac (2012).
2012-08-28	Prine, Robert (50)	Louisiana (Reserve)	A man and woman were shot and killed during an altercation with police at a trailer park. Police say they were armed. This incident occurred during Hurricane Isaac (2012).
2012-08-28	Shull, Christopher (25)	California (Bellflower)	A police chase began in Fullerton after Shull refused to pull over for a traffic violation. Eventually a collision occurred between at least one police car and the man's vehicle. Police exited their cars, and shot Shull to death after he allegedly tried to run them over.
2012-08-28	Francis, Tony Louis (25)	California (Bellflower)	A deputy said he saw Francis punch a man in the face, rob him, and flee. The deputy followed Francis into a driveway and ended up shooting and killing while still inside his vehicle. The deputy said Francis reached for his waistband, but no gun was found.
2012-08-28	unknown male	Florida (Marianna)	Police were hunting for a suspect in an armed robbery after a woman reported a man with a gun stealing her cell phone at a CVS Pharmacy. After tracking the man in the woods for several hours, he made it to the highway and encountered police. As he retreated into the woods he allegedly reached for a gun, and officers shot him to death. Police have thus far been unable to determine the man's identity.
2012-08-28	Baber, Luke (20)	West Virginia (Charleston)	Officers pulled over suspect. An altercation developed during which suspect took an officer's weapon, killing one officer and injuring another, who died two weeks later. The suspect fled and became involved in a shootout with a third officer who was injured and killed the suspect.
2012-08-27	Ruiz, Pedro (32)	California (Antioch)	Officers were responding to report of a domestic dispute involving a gun. They began pursuing an armed suspect by car, and then on foot after the suspect rammed two police cars and then crashed. Officers shot the suspect to death on the roof of a house after he allegedly pointed a gun at them.
2012-08-27	De Las Nieves, Edwardo (31)	California (Acampo)	A police chase began after a man refused to pull over for a traffic violation and officers discovered the vehicle had been reported stolen. After a 36-minute chase, officers executed a PIT maneuver and the car went into a ditch. Officers opened fired when the vehicle drove in reverse, striking a highway patrol car. De Las Nieves was killed and a female passenger was injured. De Las Nieves had escaped from a low-security county prison 2 weeks prior.
2012-08-27	unnamed male	Pennsylvania (Philadelphia)	Police responded to a report of a disturbance to find two men arguing. One of the men had a knife and turned and threatened an officer, who then shot and killed him.
2012-08-25	Palmer, Aaron (24)	Oklahoma (Seminole)	An officer was at the Palmer's home serving a felony warrant against Palmer's father, Randall Palmer. The younger Palmer allegedly confronted the officer with a knife. The officer fired once, striking him in the chest. Palmer died later at the hospital.
2012-08-24	unnamed male	North Carolina (Goldsboro)	Killed during an exchange of gunfire between officers serving a drug-related search warrant and the suspects. An officer and another suspect were injured.
2012-08-24	Johnson, Jeffrey (53)	New York (New York)	Shot and killed by police at the Empire State Building while trying to flee after fatally shooting a former co-worker. Eight bystanders were wounded by police gunfire.
2012-08-24	Payton, Albert Jermaine (24)	Washington DC	A man with a knife was killed during a confrontation with police.
2012-08-24	unnamed male	Arkansas (Sherwood)	An off-duty officer was woken in his home by the sounds of a break-in. He fatally shot the intruder.
2012-08-23	Soto, Gabriel (30)	Georgia (Jonesboro)	Officers responded to a report of a home burglary. Soto resisted arrest, was subdued with a Taser and later died at the hospital. Soto's father claims Soto was healthy. Police report Soto had drugs in his system and went into cardiac arrest. Witnesses report that the home burglarized belonged to a police officer.
2012-08-23	unnamed person	Pennsylvania (Philadelphia)	An officer stopped a vehicle for driving recklessly. The driver fled, dragging the officer who fired multiple times. The driver was taken to a hospital and later pronounced dead.
2012-08-22	Schluderberg, Michael J. (25)	Maryland (Centreville)	Schluderberg escaped from a nearby prison, broke into a home and stole a knife and gun. When he was spotted by officers, he ignored their orders. Schluderberg allegedly fired at officers, who returned fire and killed him.
2012-08-22	Robinson, Calvin (21)	Alabama (Brighton)	One person was killed and another injured as narcotics officers interacted with suspects in an ongoing investigation.
2012-08-21	Ramsey-White, Burrell (26)	Massachusetts (Boston)	Suspect was shot and killed after a brief chase that ended when Ramsey-White allegedly brandished a handgun at officers. Officers shot and killed him after he refused to obey orders to put the weapon down.
2012-08-21	Abrams, Terrance Lamar (23)	Florida (Pensacola)	Officers were responding to a call about a shooting. They spotted the suspect a few blocks away and ordered him to the ground. The suspect failed to comply, and shot at officers, who fatally shot him.
2012-08-21	Sweeny, Jeramey (30)	Florida (Lake City)	Sweeny exited his apartment and pointed a gun at officers who were responding to a domestic disturbance call. One of the three officers drew his weapon and fired, killing Sweeny.
2012-08-20	Rodgers, Steven Duane (34)	Arizona (Tucson)	Rodgers was walking across a street when he was struck and killed by a police cruiser. The cruiser, which had its lights and sirens on, was responding to a call about a fight involving a weapon.
2012-08-20	Street, Damion Lavent (33)	Mississippi (Oktibbeha County)	Two county deputies were responding to a call about a man in the road with a knife. When the officers arrived, the man attacked one of them. After pepper spray and a taser were ineffective at stopping the attack, the second deputy shot and killed the suspect.
2012-08-20	Wright, Ronald Lovell (31)	Tennessee (Chattanooga)	Wright was shot to death after allegedly pointing a gun at an officer. Police were responding to a home invasion.
2012-08-20	Oregero, Joseph Paul (57)	California (Placentia)	Killed by SWAT team after barricading himself inside an RV.
2012-08-19	Selgado, Benjamin (29)	New Mexico (Clovis)	Officers attempted to stop Selgado (also reported as Santiago) for speeding when he led them on a short vehicle chase. Selgado fled on foot then aimed a handgun at officers. Selgado was shot three times and died at the scene.
2012-08-18	Bell, Rudolph (63)	Maryland (Baltimore)	Officers were searching a vacant building after a complaint about a burglary. Bell allegedly attacked one of them with a knife or broken bottle. The second officer shot and killed Bell.
2012-08-18	Bailey, DeEric (22)	Louisiana (Shreveport)	Police attempted to pull over a car for traffic violations. The driver attempted to flee but ended up wrecking the car. The passengers exited the vehicle, but the driver attempted to flee again. Officers fired into the car, fatally wounding the driver.
2012-08-17	Demaree, Paul D (38)	Kentucky (Frankfort)	Officers responded to a report of domestic violence. An injured woman was outside the home and a man with a handgun was inside. Demaree ignored commands to put the gun down and was shot multiple times, dying of his wounds.
2012-08-17	Conner, Dallas Antwan (29)	North Carolina (Winston-Salem)	Shot by a plainclothes officer during an armed robbery of car dealership.
2012-08-17	Willingham, Kevin (51)	Ohio (Cincinnati)	Shot by an officer after he pointed a gun at the officer and a social worker. The officer and social worker were at his house to take guardianship of Willingham's disabled sister.
2012-08-16	Hardemon, Ivan Carl (24)	Iowa (Iowa City)	Two undercover drug enforcement officers were attempting a drug sting in a trailer park when they were patted down and discovered. Agent Daniel Stepleton shot Hardemon four times after he allegedly held a gun to the officer's head. Stepleton also shot and wounded Demarco Dudley.
2012-08-15	Mack, David W. (70)	Washington (Littlerock)	Mack was reportedly blocking traffic while armed with a rifle. When officers arrived, Mack ran into his house. Mack fired at officers, and later exited his house and pointed a gun at officers who then shot and killed him.
2012-08-14	Riso, Joseph Carmelo (32)	California (Folsom)	Police searching a residential area for bank robbery suspect began to chase the Riso through backyards and even a rooftop. Suspect eventually broke into a home; the family inside locked themselves in a bedroom. The suspect was shot in the back as he tried to gain entry into the locked room. He was not armed.
2012-08-14	Mahoney, Michael (36)	California (Oxnard)	Police received calls about a man with a gun. When officers arrived at the scene, Mahoney had gone inside. Mahoney was shot after a standoff with police.
2012-08-14	Evans, Michael (23)	Oregon (Gladstone)	Officers responding to a domestic disturbance call confronted Evans, who was holding a knife. Officers shot and killed Evans in his front yard.
2012-08-14	Sheffield, Randy Lynn (54)	California (Modesto)	Officers were responding to a stabbing. They found the suspect sitting in his vehicle. The suspect attempted to escape, but ended up hitting the front of a house. Officers shot and killed him when he tried to reverse in order to attempt to flee again.
2012-08-14	Collins, Charles William (40)	Florida (Miami)	Collins was shot and killed in front of a pawn shop while allegedly driving his car in reverse toward detectives. Police said detectives were investigating Collins and that he told them he needed to get his ID from his vehicle when he attempted to flee.
2012-08-14	unnamed male (47)	Texas (Alvin)	Officers arrived at scene after suspect had shot his ex-girlfriend's new boyfriend and had taken her hostage. During a multi-hour standoff suspect refused to release woman and threatened to kill her and himself. A SWAT team member fatally shot the suspect with one shot.
2012-08-13	Lamboy, Anthony Lee (26)	South Carolina (Greenville)	Lamboy was wanted for questioning in a sexual assault and for an existing warrant. When an officer attempted to taser him, Lamboy knocked the taser out of the officer's hand. Lamboy then attempted to get the officer's handgun from the holster. In the struggle for the handgun, it discharged striking the officer in the thigh. Two other officers then shot and killed Lamboy.
2012-08-13	Lowe, Mister Bobby (36)	Alabama (Decatur)	An officer-involved shooting occurred at Summerplace Apartments. Lowe allegedly fought an officer for the officer's rifle. When the officer was knocked to the ground, he drew his handgun and shot Lowe twice.
2012-08-13	Caffall, Thomas "Tres" (35)	Texas (College Station)	Caffall was shot and killed during gunfight with officers, after killing a Brazos County Constable who was serving an eviction notice.
2012-08-13	Tate, Hubert Stanley (65)	Georgia (Lula)	Officers responded to report of man walking on street with a large handgun. Tate fled to his camper, in which he lived. An hours long standoff ensued. When SWAT members shot tear gas into the camper, Tate fired at police, injuring one. Officers returned fire, killing Tate.
2012-08-13	Wann, Theodore (23)	California (Yucaipa)	A man called police when he felt his son was behaving strangely and may have ingested drugs. When police arrived, Wann fled, and eventually was engaged in a struggle with a deputy. The deputy shot Wann to death after the young man allegedly attacked him with a shovel.
2012-08-12	Fernandez, Eddie	New York (New York)	Police pursued a friend of Fernandez's who was riding a motorcycle the wrong way down a one-way street. The friend got onto the back of a motorcycle Fernandez was riding and they fled together. The police pursued in a squad car, accidentally rear-ending the motorcycle and killing Fernandez.
2012-08-12	Wiggins, Darryl C. (47)	North Carolina (Smithfield)	Officers responded to a report of shots fired and found Wiggins in front of a house with another man who appeared to have been assaulted. Officers shot Wiggins to death after he allegedly refused commands to drop a handgun and pointed it at officers.
2012-08-12	Harrison, Gregory H. (46)	Kentucky (Bowling Green)	Harrison had called 9-1-1 and claimed that he had a gun. When officers arrived he kept one hand hidden, and refused to listen to officers commands. An officer shot Harrison fatally when he advanced towards the officers.
2012-08-12	Moore, Bobby (15)	Arkansas (Little Rock)	Moore and two other teens were in a stolen vehicle when they allegedly attempted to run down a police officer. The officer shot into the car, striking and killing Moore. The investigation determined that the vehicle was either stopped or moving in reverse, away from the officer. Officer Josh Hastings has been charged with manslaughter and is currently awaiting trial.
2012-08-12	Perryman, Michael (52)	Georgia (Decatur)	Police say they responded to a Chevron gas station after customers claimed that a man was threatening them with a knife. Officers shot Perryman to death when he refused to drop the weapon.
2012-08-11	Middleton, Christopher (26)	Illinois (Maywood)	An off-duty Officer ditched his motorcycle in an attempt to miss a 4-year old that had run into the street at 10:00 p.m. The bike ended up hitting the little girl, who received non-life-threatening injuries. Middleton, the little girl's father, came out of a nearby restaurant and started to beat the officers along with his cousin, John Passley. The officer took out his pistol and fired one shot, fatally striking Middleton in the groin. Passley was charged with assault.
2012-08-11	Kennedy, Darrius (51)	New York (New York City)	Police approached Kennedy on suspicion of smoking marijuana in Times Square. Kennedy drew a knife, and started to walk away. The officers used pepper spray, but it failed to stop him. The officers shot and killed him, after he allegedly lunged at them with the knife.
2012-08-11	Galmon, Cjavar (18)	Louisiana (Tangipahoa)	Shot and killed by officers after they broke up a large fight at a nearby club.
2012-08-10	O'Fallon, Donald (43)	Arkansas (Little Rock)	Shot and killed by officers responding to a domestic dispute call.
2012-08-10	Gabriel, Keith A. (61)	Wisconsin (Appleton)	Gabriel was shot after refusing to drop his gun. Officer was responding to a call about illegal fireworks being set off.
2012-08-10	Riley, Dennis (38)	Arizona (Tucson)	A man was shot and killed by officers responding to reports of him assaulting a woman and pointing a gun at someone in their car.
2012-08-09	Young, Divonte (20)	Illinois (Chicago)	Young was shot to death by an officer after firing and refusing to drop the weapon he was holding. The officer had just witnessed Young open fire on at least two people in front of a grocery store.
2012-08-09	Green, James Lamont (27)	Delaware (New Castle)	An officer stopped his vehicle while he was fleeing from the scene of an earlier shooting. Green allegedly drove his car towards the officer while reaching for his weapon. The officer shot Green. Green died the following day in hospital.
2012-08-09	Holland, Percy (32)	Maryland (Columbia)	Police were looking for a man suspected of holding his ex-girlfriend hostage at gunpoint and then fleeing with their 2-year-old son. They located him in a residence and confronted him behind the home. The man was shot to death by officers after he refused to show his hands.
2012-08-09	Pratt, Hassan (28)	Pennsylvania (Philadelphia)	Police were attempting a traffic stop when two men fled on foot and the driver fled in the vehicle. After a foot chase, an officer caught up to one suspect and a struggle ensued. The suspect allegedly reached for the officer's taser, and the officer shot the man two times, killing him.
2012-08-09	Jaramillo, Damaris (21)	Florida (Homestead)	Police were investigating the kidnapping of two teenagers when they found them inside a trailer. A woman in the trailer allegedly threatened the officers with a gun, and she was shot and killed.
2012-08-09	Moreno, Gustavo Pedro (57)	California (Vacaville)	Moreno was shot to death by an officer after threatening him with a knife. Moreno was displaying irrational behavior and had come to the station to request a meeting with officers.
2012-08-09	Weldon, Shulena (36)	Pennsylvania (Harrisburg)	A pedestrian was struck and killed by a police vehicle.
2012-08-08	Haggerty, Elijah (31)	Louisiana (Shreveport)	Officers were responding to a shooting and found a woman with gunshot wounds outside a home. In the home, they found Haggerty, who allegedly pointed a shotgun at the officers. Two officers fired at the man, killing him.
2012-08-08	Clore, Dennis Allen (54)	California (San Bernardino)	Shot to death by officers after refusing to drop the baseball bat he was holding. Officers were responding to a domestic dispute.
2012-08-08	Retherford, Billy Ray (42)	Florida (Fort Myers)	Officers were attempting to arrest Retherford for murder and allegedly found him armed. Deputies shot him to death.
2012-08-08	House, Jonte Loven (24)	California (Long Beach)	House was shot to death by officers following a chase that began when officers were investigating a drug store robbery. Officers said they believed they were being shot at during the chase. Officers killed House and injured another man when they exited the vehicle.
2012-08-08	unnamed female	Florida (Miami)	Undercover officers responded to a report of a kidnapping. During the rescue a woman armed with a handgun was fatally shot by officers.
2012-08-07	Brown, Devante (20)	Louisiana (Lafayette)	Brown was being chased by officers who suspected him of engaging in a drug transaction. Brown allegedly fired at officers, who shot him multiple times, killing him.
2012-08-07	unnamed male	Texas (Houston)	Officer responded to report of a man attempting to enter the place of business where his estranged wife worked. Suspect reportedly threatened to harm his wife. Officer ordered suspect to not enter his vehicle and to show his hands. Suspect did enter his own vehicle and appeared to be searching for something. The suspect exited his vehicle and kept one hand behind his back. Officer shot suspect when he suddenly raised his hand. The suspect was armed with a pistol.
2012-08-05	Cash, Jimmy Dean (50)	North Carolina (Catawba)	Police were called to a home about a hostage situation. Cash allegedly came outside and pointed a gun at officers, who shot the 50-year-old man to death.
2012-08-05	Robles, Ralph (47)	California (Brawley)	Robles was shot to death by officers after allegedly opening fire on them. Officers said they began following him after the driver of the truck, who caught him in the act of burglary directed the police to his location.
2012-08-05	Hattersly, James (28)	Ohio (Columbus)	Police were called when hotel employees saw Hattersly threaten his wife with a gun. Officers shot and killed the 28-year-old after he allegedly pointed a gun at them.
2012-08-04	Day, Deborah Jo (55)	Alabama (Madison)	Officers were responding to calls from neighbors who said that Day had threatened to shoot them with a handgun. Officers said they found Day armed, and they shot her to death after she refused to drop the weapon. Day had a long history of mental illness, according to the forensic examiner.
2012-08-04	unnamed male (22)	Georgia (Fayetteville)	Officers responded to a report of a fight in a home. They arrived to find the suspect holding a knife to the throat of a 17-year-old. The suspect ignored multiple orders to drop the knife. An officer fired a single shot which killed the suspect.
2012-08-03	Abrahamson, Justin Lloyd (29)	Alaska (Anchorage)	Suspect led police on car chase when officers attempted to pull his vehicle over for failing to signal a turn. Suspect allegedly advanced on officers with a raised baseball bat. Suspect was shot and killed after a taser did not stop him.
2012-08-03	Roedig, Kenneth (68)	Ohio (Green Township)	Officers responded to a report that Roedig was intoxicated, had been asked to leave a neighbor's party, and had subsequently fired shots at the neighbor's house. When officers arrived at Roedig's home he threatened suicide. A special response team was called to assist. Roedig was fatally shot when he stepped out of his home and pointed a rifle at officers.
2012-08-02	Burchell, Joshua (35)	Nevada (Las Vegas)	Burchell was under surveillance by the FBI and was wanted for armed robbery. When agents moved in to arrest him in a parking lot, an agent shot Burchell multiple times, killing him. An FBI agent said the man had a gun.
2012-08-02	Reyes, Robert Padilla (37)	California (Santa Maria)	Officers responding to a report of a man with a gun became involved in an hour-long high-speed pursuit with the suspect. After police used spike strips to disable the vehicle, the man allegedly stepped out with a gun. Officers shot the man to death.
2012-08-02	Berger, Michael Craig (47)	California (Fair Oaks)	Officers executing an arrest warrant shot and killed Berger when he exited his garage holding a long-barreled shotgun.
2012-08-01	McMurtry, Robert (50)	Oklahoma (Morris)	Officers were responding to a report of a suicidal individual when a deputy shot McMurtry to death. He had allegedly threatened them with a machete.
2012‑08‑01	Fears, Charlene (38)	New York (Buffalo)	Patrolling officers were flagged down and alerted of an injured child. They found a child who had been stabbed and allegedly were calling for an ambulance when Fears, covered in blood, approached them with two knives. One officer shot Fears to death. The child was her grandson.

== Known Erroneous Reports ==
This section includes deaths which were initially reported as police killings but later turned out not to be.

Date	Name	State (City)	Initial Reports	Later Reports
2012‑08‑05	Page, Wade Michael	Wisconsin (Oak Creek)	Page shot 9 people, including a police officer, at a Sikh temple. Another police officer then shot him. Page died at the scene.	Page shot himself in the head after being struck in the stomach by an officer. It was determined that the self-inflicted gunshot was the cause of death.

== See also ==
- Death in custody § United States
- Henry A. Wallace Police Crime Public Database
- List of cases of police brutality
- List of countries with annual rates and counts for killings by law enforcement officers
- List of law enforcement officers killed in the line of duty in the United States
- List of law enforcement officers convicted for an on-duty killing in the United States
- List of shootings by US immigration agents
- List of police reforms related to the George Floyd protests
- List of unarmed African Americans killed by law enforcement officers in the United States
- Lists of killings by law enforcement officers
- Police brutality in the United States
- Police misconduct § United States
- Police riot § United States
- Police use of deadly force in the United States
