= List of killings by law enforcement officers in the United States, September 2010 =

This is a list of people reported killed by non-military law enforcement officers in the United States in September 2010, whether in the line of duty or not, and regardless of reason or method. The listing documents the occurrence of a death, making no implications regarding wrongdoing or justification on the part of the person killed or officer involved. Killings are arranged by date of the incident that caused death. Different death dates, if known, are noted in the description. The table below lists 32 people.

== September 2010 ==
Date	Name (Age) of Deceased	State (city)	Description
2010-09-30	AlfredMoton, Sr. (54)	New Jersey (Pennsauken)	Moton shot his three sons, fatally wounding two and critically injuring the third, and set their tidy southern New Jersey home afire before police killed him.
2010-09-30	Kole Ravel (35)	Arizona (Mesa)	
2010-09-30	Anna Beach (35)	Florida (Parker)	
2010-09-30	Danny Withers (21)	Ohio (Cleveland)	Withers was shot once in the chest when he jumped out of a closet in a darkened basement, surprising officers who were serving a warrant for his arrest.
2010-09-29	Jeff Layten (39)	Nebraska (Omaha)	Police say the man shot by two officers inside Creighton University Medical Center died Wednesday afternoon following a morning confrontation with police. The two officers were wounded.
2010-09-28	Jack Schlesinger (25)	California (Los Angeles)	Three officers on patrol came upon a suspicious-looking vehicle. A check of its license plate revealed that the car had been reported stolen and the suspected thief was thought to be armed and dangerous, said an LAPD spokesman. The officers stopped the car. Schlesinger exited and turned toward the officers, armed with an AK-47 assault rifle or similar weapon, the spokesman said. Two officers opened fire, killing Schlesinger, he said. Authorities said that along with the rifle, a handgun was discovered in Schlesinger's back pocket.
2010-09-27	Robert Roll	Florida (Clearwater)	
2010-09-27	Jerome Williams (15)	Pennsylvania (Pittsburgh)	A 911 caller reported that two to three people with guns had broken into her home. Officers responding to the scene chased three boys as they fled the home, but Jerome turned toward them and ignored their orders to drop his gun, Chief Harper said. Instead, Jerome fired multiple shots at the officers, he said. One or both of the officers fired multiple shots back, and the boy was fatally struck in the head.
2010-09-24	Matt Moroni (39)	Michigan (Sterling Heights)	Matt (suicidal) came out with a handgun and pointed it at police. They say when Matt wouldn't put the gun down, they opened fire, killing him.
2010-09-24	Rita Elias (31)	California (Stanislaus)	Physical altercation between Elias and Kari Abbey (off-duty Stanislaus sheriff's detective). At one point Elias went back into the home and came back out with a branch in her left hand and a gun in the right. Abbey fired at Elias, striking her multiple times. It was later revealed Elias was holding a BB gun.
2010-09-24	Lonnie George Cockren, Sr. (58)	California (Bakersfield)	Cockren was shot and killed by Bakersfield Police Officer William Caughell after Cockern pulled a revolver from his waist and pointed it toward officers.
2010-09-22	Marcus Rogers (18)	Florida (Miami)	
2010-09-22	James David, Sr. (60)	Ohio (Bellevue)	Police received a call from a resident who reported a man was brandishing a handgun. Two officers responded and found Mr. David sitting on his front porch holding the gun. The officers identified themselves and the man stood up and ran toward the front door of the house. Officers said they then ordered him to drop the weapon and stop, but he instead ran back toward the end of the porch and pointed the gun at police. Both officers then fired at Mr. David.
2010-09-22	José Vega Jorge (22)	Puerto Rico (Guaynabo)	Following a robbery at a Burger King Vega Jorge and his friends spoke to police and showed them where the assailants had fled. Another police officer mistook Vega Jorge for the robber and shot him in the head.
2010-09-18	Harry Seavey (51)	Ohio (Cincinnati)	Shot during gunbattle with police. Undercover agents were approaching bar where Seavey was standing guard and fired on agents.
2010-09-16	Todd Blair (45)	Utah (Ogden/Roy)	Blair, 45, was shot three times by Strike Force Sgt. Troy Burnett as agents entered his home with a no-knock search warrant, officials said. The warrant was issued on allegations Blair was selling meth and heroin from his home. Blair was brandishing a golf club when he was shot, officials said.
2010-09-14	Eric Bricker (43)	Florida (Micco)	
2010-09-11	Franklin Bodden (39)	Florida (Callaham)	
2010-09-11	Brent Bayliffe (30)	Washington (Olalla)	Shot after attacking an off-duty state trooper at the trooper's home.
2010-09-11	Manuel Serna (38)	California (Fresno)	Serna's relatives called Fresno County Sheriffs Deputies to the house after he had fired a rifle and threatened to shoot deputies if they arrived. Serna fired more shots after the deputies arrived. After a standoff of several hours a SWAT team stormed the house and Serna was shot and killed.
2010-09-10	David Smith (28)	Minnesota (Minneapolis)	Police were called after reports of a man acting erratically at a YMCA facility. Officers put a knee on Smith's back for several minutes until he stopped breathing. The case gained some attention after the 2020 murder of George Floyd, which also occurred in Minneapolis and also involved an officer putting a knee on a black man.
2010-09-09	David Bennett (40)	Florida (Boynton Beach)	
2010-09-07	Kamyn Bright (17)	Florida (Fort Myers)	
2010-09-07	Nikkolas W. Lookabill (22)	Washington (Vancouver)	Shot after refusing to commands to drop weapon. Police were responding to report of a man walking the neighborhood armed with a handgun
2010-09-06	Kevin B Pao (22)	Georgia (Augusta)	Shot while reaching for gun in a bag during struggle with officer. Police were responding to report of a man bathing in the restroom of a restaurant.
2010-09-05	Manuel Ramirez (37)	California (Los Angeles)	Three officers with the bicycle unit from the LAPD's Rampart Division were patrolling the area when a pedestrian flagged them down and told them a man with a knife was threatening people, authorities said. Officers approached Ramirez, ordered him to drop the knife and fired the fatal shots when he didn't comply, he said.
2010-09-03	Michael Lewis Chesney (54)	Tennessee (Knoxville)	When an officer lifted the bed skirt on a bed, Chesney fired a round from under the bed from a 9mm semiautomatic pistol at Officer Brandon Stryker, hitting him in the torso. Police said Stryker and two other officers returned fire. Chesney died at the scene.
2010-09-03	Richard Wayne Sims (64)	Washington (Tacoma)	Shot after refusing commands to put down knife and then raising knife in an overhand threatening manner. Police were responding to a report of a man waving a knife around in front of a bus stop.
2010-09-03	Amin Rocha (32)	Texas (Houston)	A Houston Police officer was working an off-duty, extra employment job at an apartment complex located at 2500 Old Farm Road. While he was at the location, the officer heard a female screaming for help. When the officer went to investigate he witnessed a male attempting to drag a female into a vehicle. The officer approached the male, identified himself as a police officer and ordered the male to put his hands on the vehicle. As the officer continued to approached, the male drew a firearm and pointed it at the officer. The officer discharged his weapon, fatally striking the male.
2010-09-03	Joshua Ferreira (19)	California (Fresno)	Fresno Police plainclothes officers were patrolling for stolen cars when they say Ferreira get into a stolen Neon. They followed him until he stopped and then tried to box him in with their two cars. In an attempt to get away he drove onto a sidewalk, where an officer was standing. The officers shot and killed Ferreira.
2010-09-02	Lance Dawkins (24)	Oklahoma (Oklahoma City)	Oklahoma City Police said security officers were trying to clear a nightclub at 2am when a man in the crowd pulled out a gun and started shooting at officers. They returned fire, hitting three people. 24-year-old suspect Lance Dawkins died from his wounds.
2010-09-01	James J. Lee (43)	Maryland (Montgomery County)	Lee, an environmental militant, was killed Wednesday at the end of a tense hostage standoff at Discovery Communications headquarters in downtown Silver Spring, Maryland.

== See also ==
- Death in custody § United States
- Henry A. Wallace Police Crime Public Database
- List of cases of police brutality
- List of countries with annual rates and counts for killings by law enforcement officers
- List of law enforcement officers killed in the line of duty in the United States
- List of law enforcement officers convicted for an on-duty killing in the United States
- List of shootings by US immigration agents
- List of police reforms related to the George Floyd protests
- List of unarmed African Americans killed by law enforcement officers in the United States
- Lists of killings by law enforcement officers
- Police brutality in the United States
- Police misconduct § United States
- Police riot § United States
- Police use of deadly force in the United States
