= 1970 Pulitzer Prize =

Awards for journalism and related fields

The following are the Pulitzer Prizes for 1970.

== Journalism awards ==
- Public Service:
  - Newsday (Garden City, New York), for its three-year investigation and exposure of secret land deals in eastern Long Island, which led to a series of criminal convictions, discharges and resignations among public and political officeholders in the area.
- Local General or Spot News Reporting:
  - Thomas Fitzpatrick of the Chicago Sun-Times, for his article about the violence of youthful radicals in Chicago, "A Wild Night's Ride With SDS".
- Local Investigative Specialized Reporting:
  - Harold E. Martin of the Montgomery Advertiser and Alabama Journal, for his expose of a commercial scheme for using Alabama prisoners for drug experimentation and obtaining blood plasma from them.
- National Reporting:
  - William J. Eaton of the Chicago Daily News, for disclosures about the background of Judge Clement F. Haynsworth, Jr., in connection with his nomination for the United States Supreme Court.
- International Reporting:
  - Seymour M. Hersh of the Dispatch News Service, for his exclusive disclosure of the Vietnam War tragedy at the hamlet of My Lai.
- Criticism or Commentary:
  - Marquis Childs of the St. Louis Post-Dispatch, for distinguished commentary during 1969.
  - Ada Louise Huxtable of The New York Times, for distinguished criticism during 1969.
- Editorial Writing:
  - Philip L. Geyelin of The Washington Post, for his editorials during 1969.
- Editorial Cartooning:
  - Thomas F. Darcy of Newsday, for his editorial cartooning during 1969.
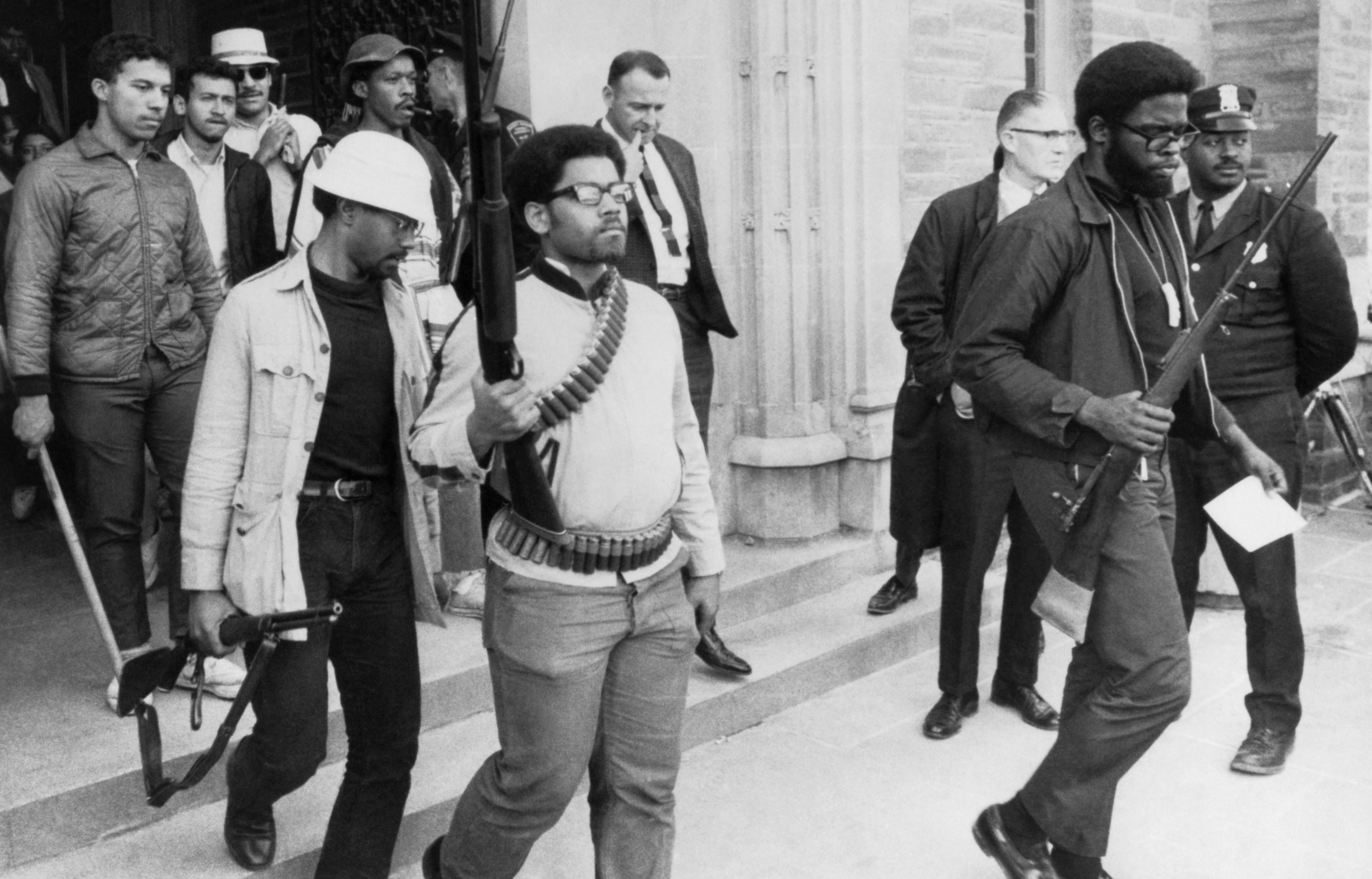
The prize-winning spot news photograph, "Campus Guns"
- Spot News Photography:
  - Steve Starr of the Associated Press, Albany, New York bureau, for his news photo taken of militant black students following their takeover of Willard Straight Hall at Cornell University, "Campus Guns".
- Feature Photography:
  - Dallas Kinney of The Palm Beach Post (Florida), for his portfolio of pictures of Florida migrant workers, "Migration to Misery".
24 of the photographs of the Feature Photography-winning set Migration to Misery by Dallas Kinney, as originally published in The Palm Beach Post

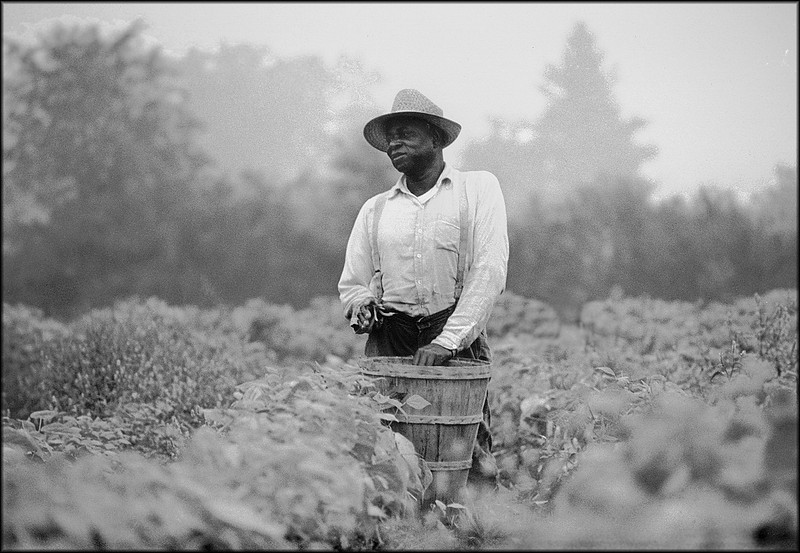

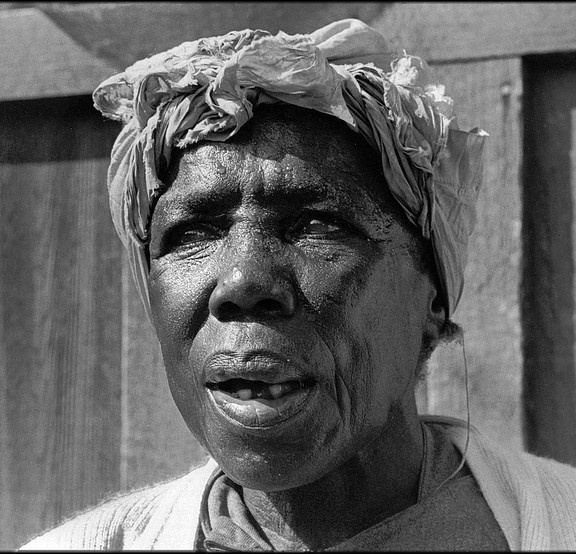

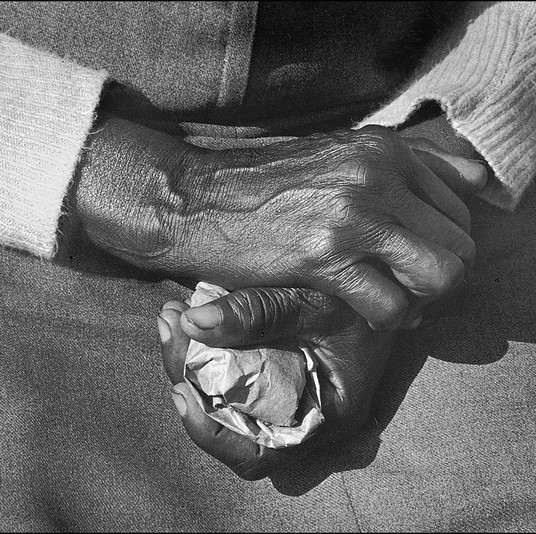

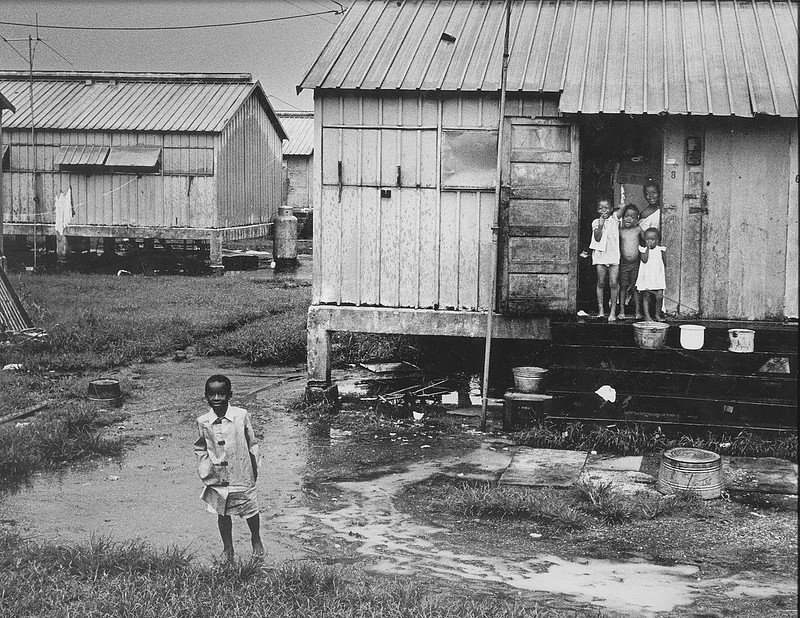

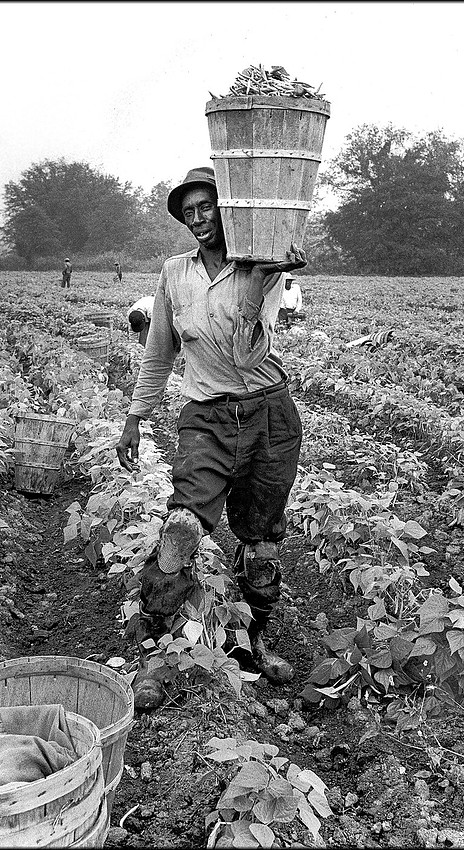

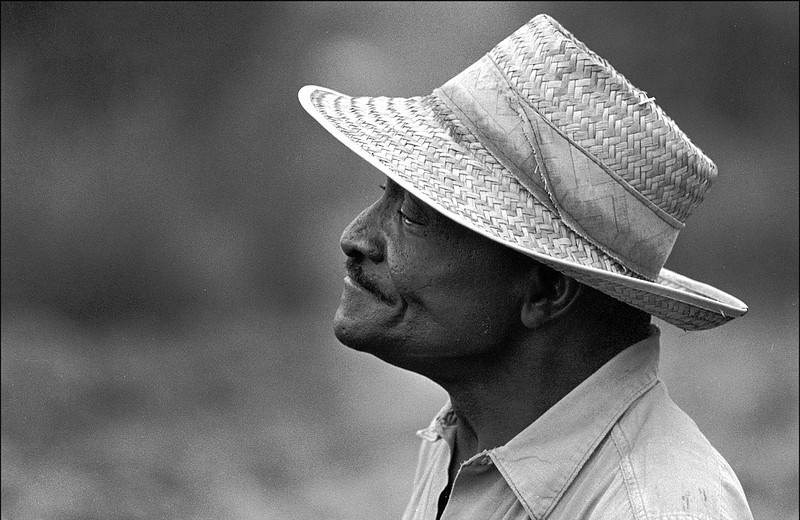

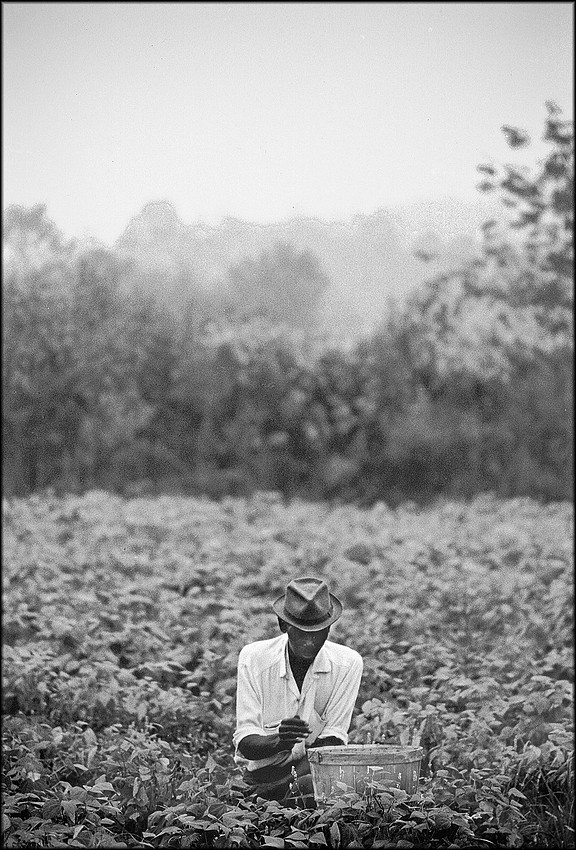

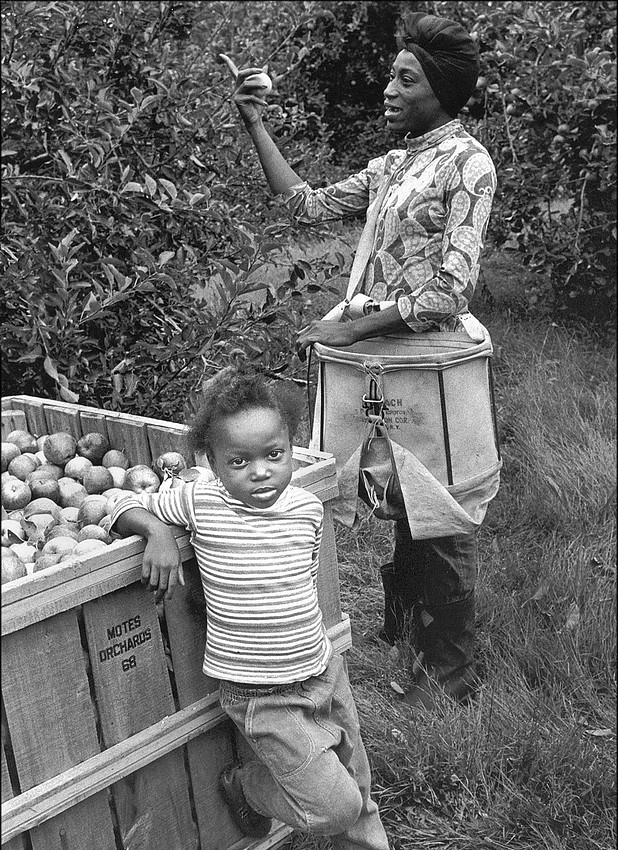

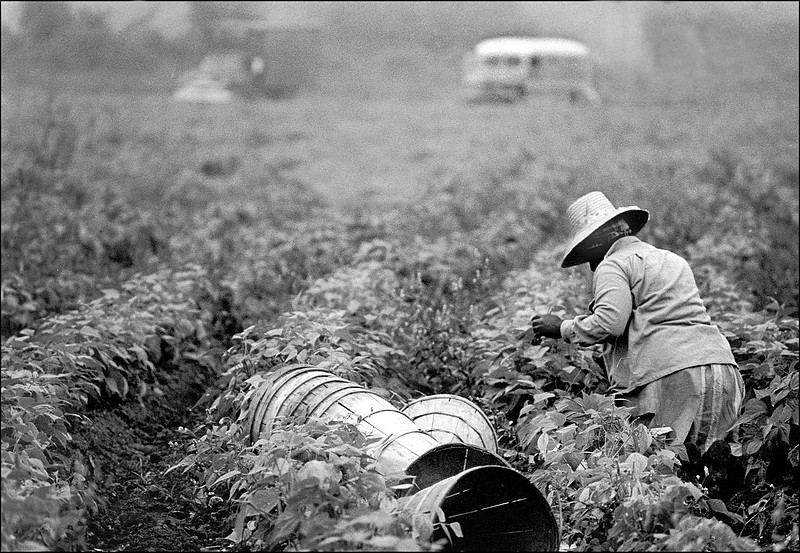

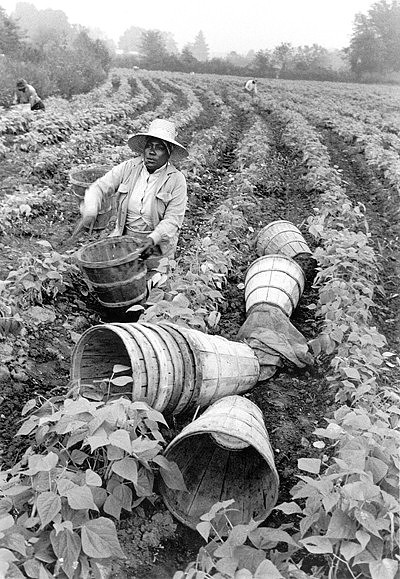

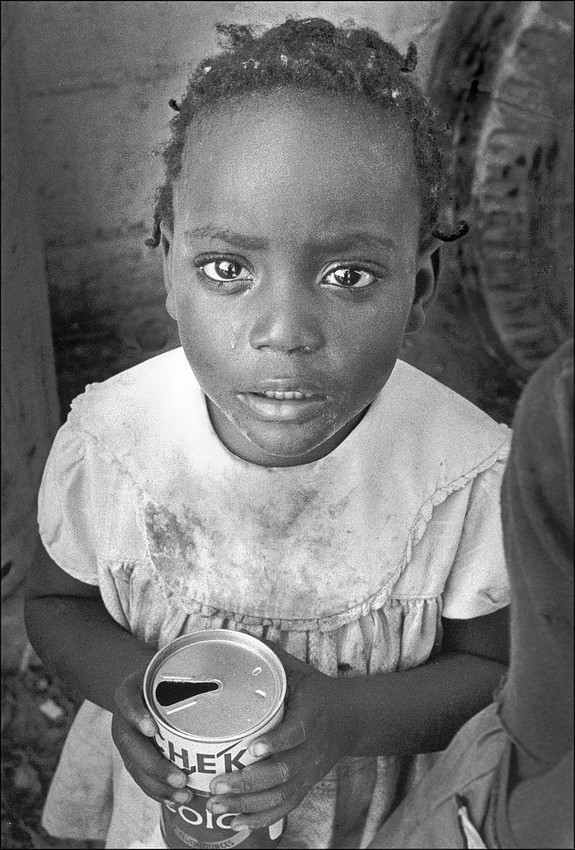

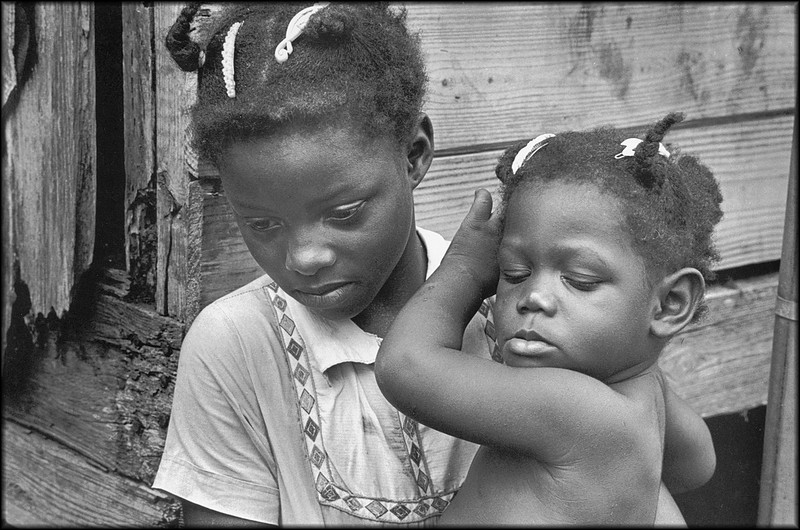

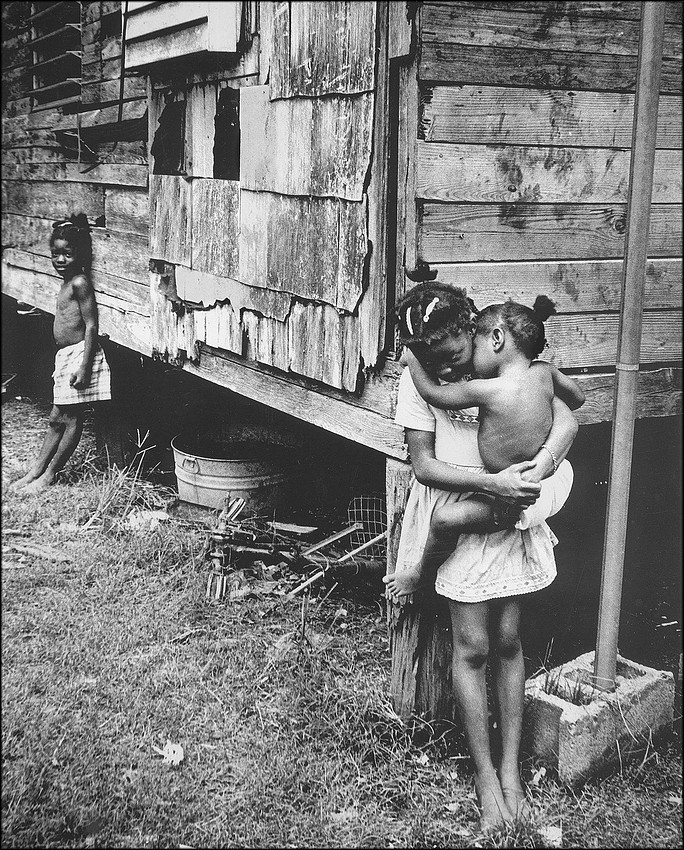

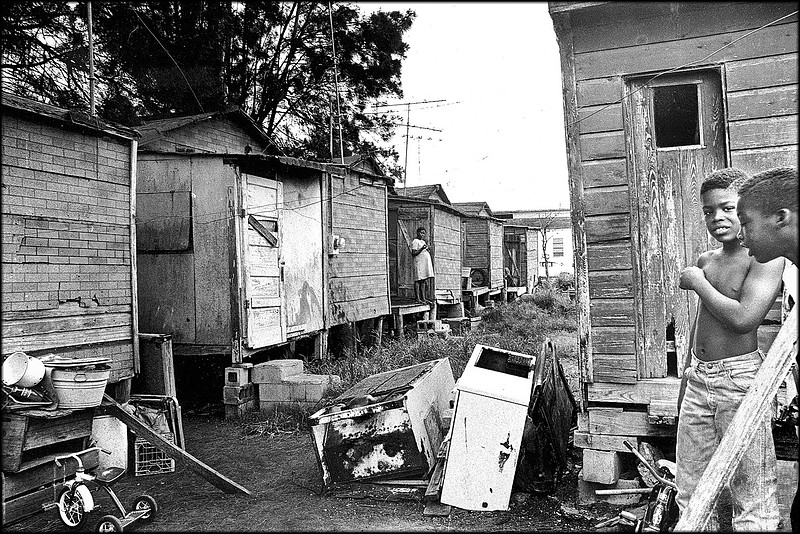

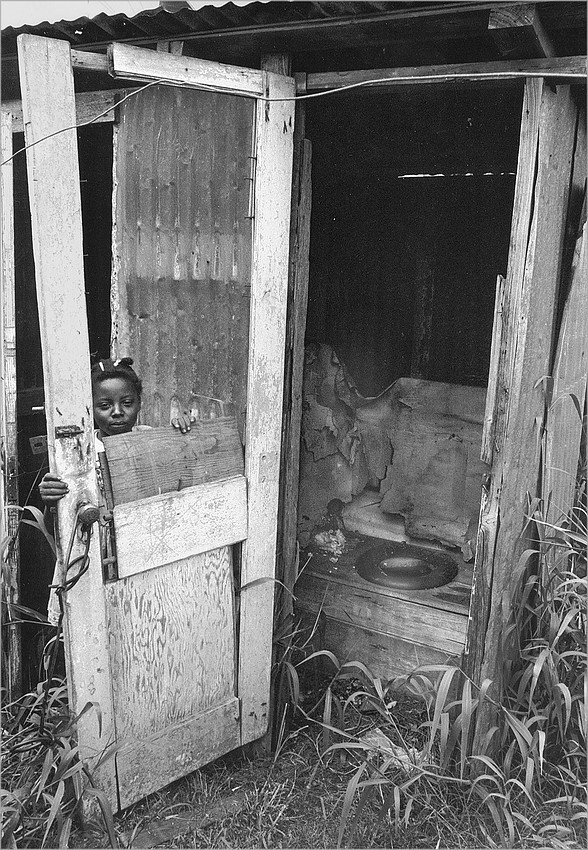

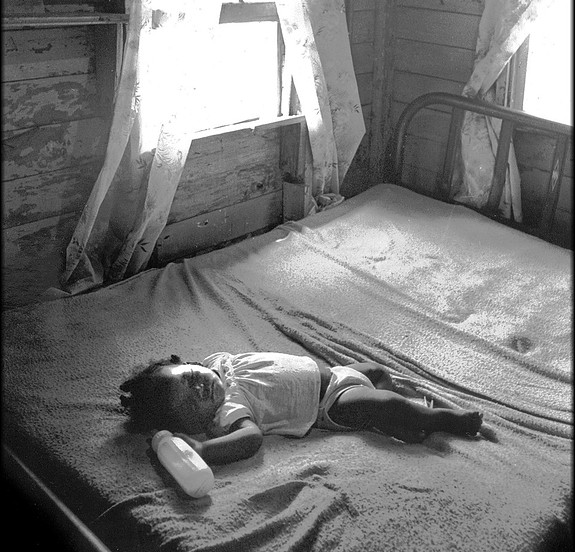

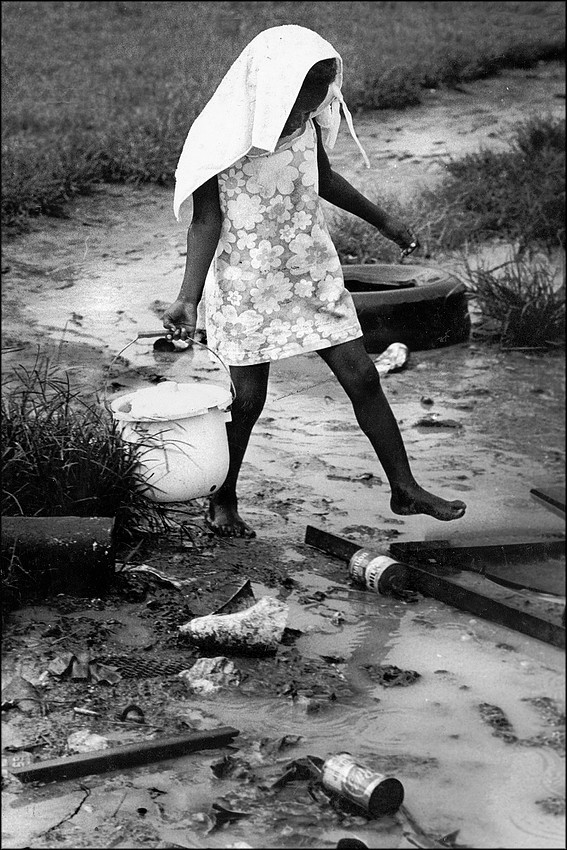

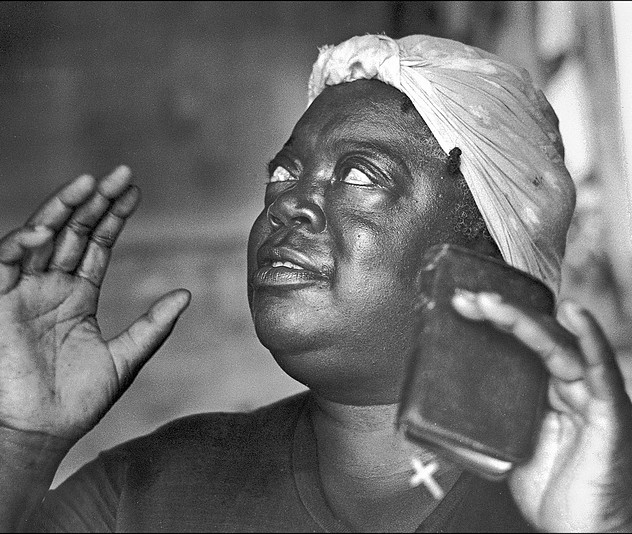

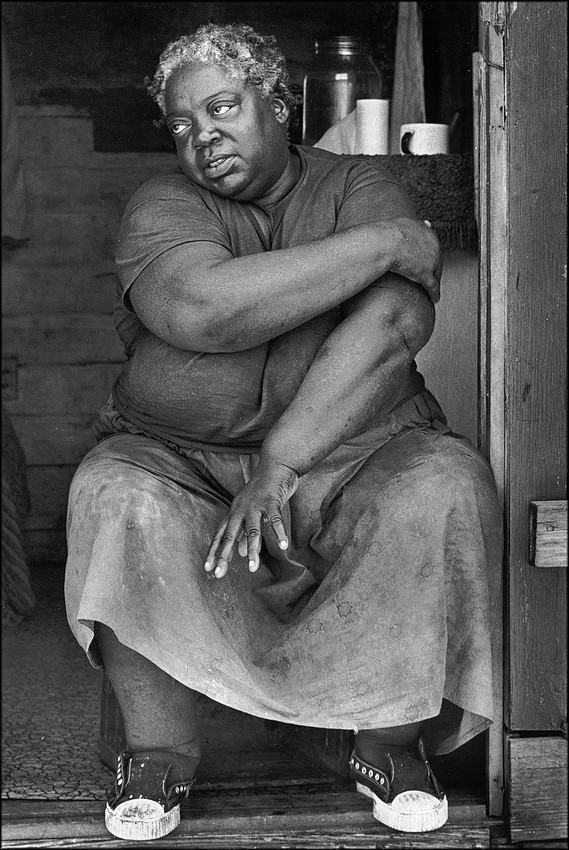

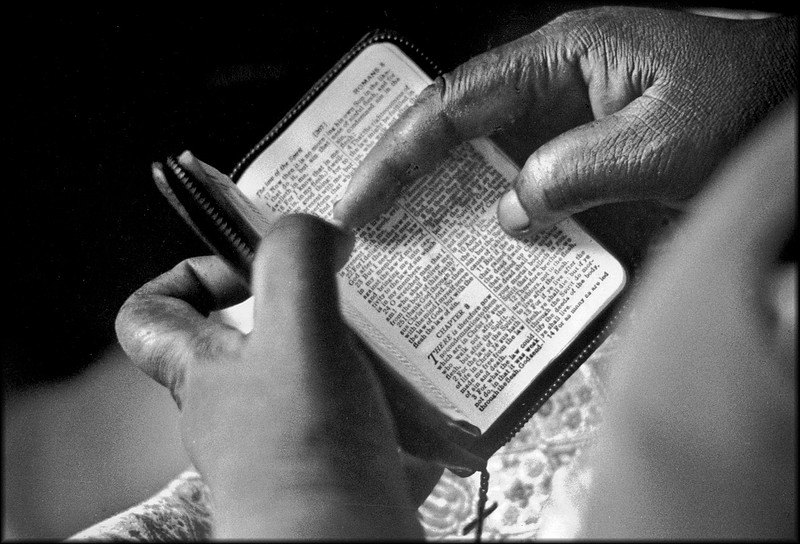

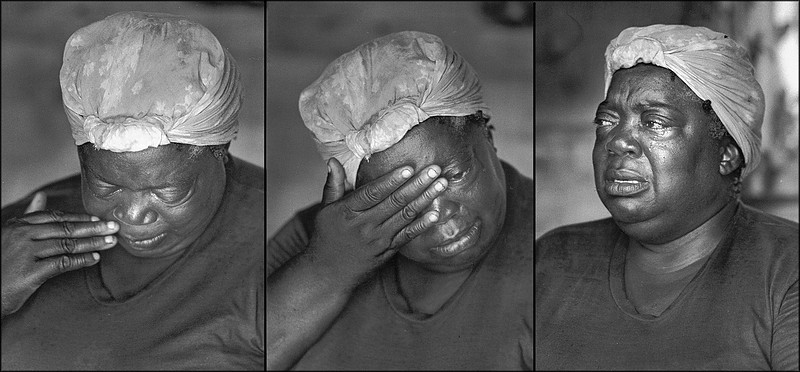

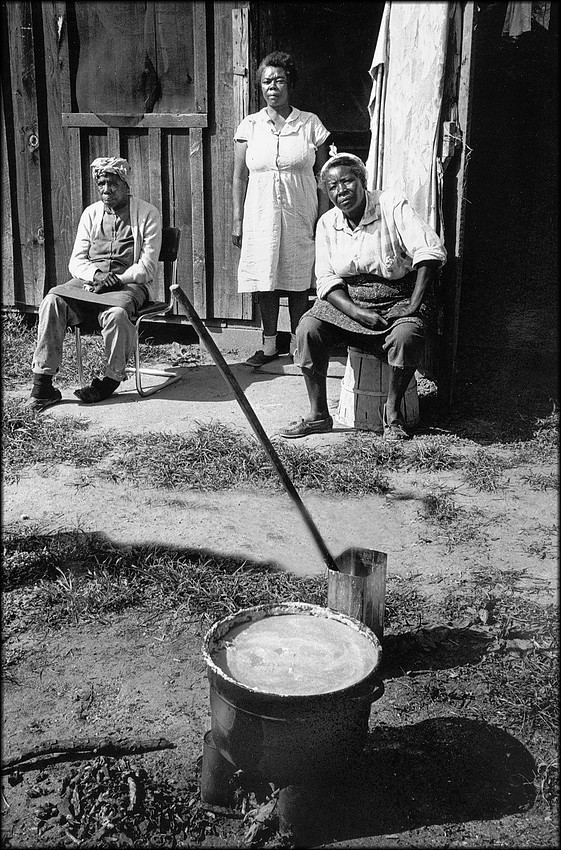

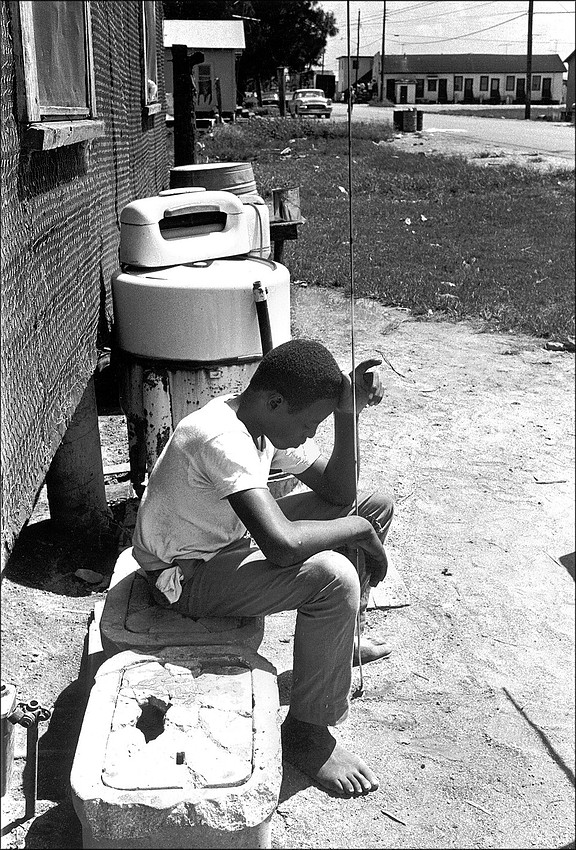

== Letters, Drama and Music Awards ==
- Fiction:
  - Collected Stories by Jean Stafford (Farrar)
- Drama:
  - No Place to be Somebody by Charles Gordone (Bobbs-Merrill)
- History:
  - Present At The Creation: My Years In The State Department by Dean Acheson (Norton)
- Biography or Autobiography:
  - Huey Long by T. Harry Williams (Knopf)
- Poetry:
  - Untitled Subjects by Richard Howard (Atheneum)
- General Nonfiction:
  - Gandhi's Truth by Erik Erikson (Norton)
- Music:
  - Time's Encomium by Charles Wuorinen (C. F. Peters)
    Premiered in its entirety at the Berkshire Music Festival on August 16, 1969.
