= Grover Cleveland Hall Jr. =

American newspaperman

Grover Cleveland Hall, Jr. (February 10, 1915 – September 24, 1971) was an Alabama newspaperman. The son of Montgomery Advertiser editor Grover C. Hall, he was educated in the Montgomery public schools and worked seven years in Advertiser reporting and writing positions before World War II military service. In the United States Army Air Corps from 1942 to 1945, he contributed some articles to the Advertiser and Alabama Journal from England. He was a Montgomery Advertiser editor after the war, and editor-in-chief from 1956 to 1971. Or from 1948 until fired in 1966. He also authored the book "1000 Destroyed" about the 4th Fighter Group of the US Army Air Corps.

Hall allied with George C. Wallace in 1958 and was preparing to be director of publications for the Wallace organization when he died in 1971. After the 16th Street Baptist Church bombing of 1963, Hall wrote that Wallace had no need to apologize for the violence he had encouraged by his call for resistance to court-ordered desegregation. Instead, he wrote, it was President John Kennedy who "inflamed the Negroes during the recent trouble by rehearsing their historic grievances. He may also have inflamed him who finally planted the dynamite at the church."

In Actual Malice, her 2023 book on New York Times Co. v. Sullivan, Samantha Barbas provides an extensive sketch of Hall. He was "larger than life", she said, "grumpy, arrogant, puckish, and confrontational". While attempting to measure up to his father he fell short, being less gifted as a writer, and never having finished college. He had trained a myna bird to greet visitors at his house with "hello fat ass", but all his swagger, according to Barbas, was to hide his insecurities. He was also complex: while supporting segregation he deplored its excesses, and wrote about those in his editorials, but he, like many other Southerners, was fiercely protective of what he saw as a Southern culture under threat from Northern liberals. In response to Northern journalist coming to Montgomery to cover the Montgomery bus boycott in 1956, he himself directed the writing of a series of thirty articles criticizing segregation practices in the North. He received praise from the Alabama House of Representatives for this; his "thorough and hard-hitting reporting was acclaimed in national publications like Newsweek and even nominated for a Pulitzer Prize", and according to Barbas one of the results was that the New York Times itself ran a series of investigative articles on racist practices in the North. His response to the advertisement in the New York Times that was the basis for New York Times Co. v. Sullivan was an editorial in the Advertiser, calling the Times "liars" who bore false witness. The day it came out, he gave a copy of the Times advertisement to a city lawyer, who in turn took it to city hall and showed it to the major and to Montgomery Public Safety commissioner L. B. Sullivan, who then took the Times to court.
