= Killing of Greg Gunn =

2016 shooting by police in Alabama, US

- Gunn in an undated photo
- Date: February 25, 2016; 10 years ago
- Time: c. 3:20 a.m.
- Location: Montgomery, Alabama, US
- Type: Police shooting
- Deaths: Greg Gunn
- Convicted: Aaron Cody Smith
- Convictions: Manslaughter
- Sentence: 14 years in prison

The killing of Greg Gunn occurred on the morning of February 25, 2016, in Montgomery, Alabama, United States. Gunn, a 58-year-old African-American man, was shot and killed near his home after fleeing from a stop-and-frisk initiated by Aaron Cody Smith, a white police officer. Smith was charged with murder and indicted by a grand jury in 2016. The case came to trial in late 2019 following a change of venue to Ozark, Alabama. Smith was found guilty of manslaughter, and, in January 2020, was sentenced to 14 years in prison.

== Background ==
Gregory Gunn lived with his mother in the Mobile Heights neighborhood in Montgomery, Alabama. He graduated from St Jude High School in 1976 and from Alabama State University in 1981 with a Bachelor's Degree in Accounting and Finance. He is also a member of the Kappa Alpha Psi fraternity. The neighborhood had experienced a number of burglaries around the time of the incident. According to Montgomery Police officer Aaron Cody Smith, Gunn matched the description of a burglary suspect: "dark clothing, black male".

== Confrontation ==
Around 3:20 a.m. on February 25, 2016, Gunn was walking home unarmed from a card game when he encountered Smith, who was patrolling the neighborhood. Smith stopped Gunn and performed a stop-and-frisk; during the encounter, Gunn fled. Smith pursued, initially attempting to use a Taser to disable Gunn, and when that failed he began striking Gunn with his baton. According to Smith's later testimony, Gunn then picked up a painter's pole, which caused Smith to fire his service weapon in what he described as self-defense. Smith shot seven times, hitting Gunn five times and killing him.

== Trial ==
Smith was placed on administrative leave following the incident and was arrested and charged with murder a week later following an Alabama Bureau of Investigation inquiry. A grand jury indicted him for murder in November 2016. He was originally going to be tried in Montgomery, but the trial was moved to Ozark in the white-majority Dale County at the request of his defense attorneys. In the request to move the trial, Smith's defense attorneys said that racial prejudice in Montgomery, media coverage of the shooting, and the actions of city officials would all affect the jury. They also described Smith as "the first and only Montgomery Police Officer ever to be arrested and charged immediately after an officer-involved shooting." Eight judges recused themselves from the trial.

During the trial, Smith testified that Gunn had grabbed a metal painter's pole during the fight, at which point he escalated to using his gun. Prosecutors argued that Gunn could not have picked up the pole based on photographs from the crime scene which showed a hat in Gunn's hand. A state investigator also testified that Gunn's fingerprints were not found on the pole. They also emphasized that Smith had given several different accounts of the fight in the years between the shooting and the trial. Smith had not turned on his body or dashboard cameras before the stop, so several details of the incident were unclear.

On November 22, 2019, a jury found Smith guilty of the lesser included charge of manslaughter. Following the verdict, Gunn's brother Franklin said: "They brought this case to a very conservative county, expecting a different outcome...But I believe that we have seen the best of Alabama today. One bad apple in a bunch has been weeded out." On January 29, 2020, Smith was sentenced to 14 years in prison. He was released on an appeal bond in March 2020 while appealing the conviction. In May 2021 the appeal was denied. On May 10, 2022, Smith began serving his sentence.

In February 2024, Alabama Attorney General Steve Marshall took over the case, stripping Montgomery District Attorney Darryl Bailey of his role as prosecutor. On February 21, 2024, Marshall agreed to a plea deal from Smith, allowing him to be released from prison on time served.

== Wrongful death suit ==
The Gunn family filed a wrongful death lawsuit in federal court against the city of Montgomery in February 2016. The suit was settled in April 2020.

== See also ==
- List of unarmed African Americans killed by law enforcement officers in the United States
- Shooting of Bernard Whitehurst
- Lists of killings by law enforcement officers in the United States
- List of killings by law enforcement officers in the United States, February 2016
