= Hal Taylor =

American law enforcement officer

Secretary of the Alabama Law Enforcement Agency
- Incumbent
- Assumed office August 11, 2017
- Appointed by: Kay Ivey
- Governor: Kay Ivey
- Preceded by: Stan Stabler

John Harold Taylor is an American law enforcement officer who has served as the secretary of the Alabama Law Enforcement Agency (ALEA) since 2017. He previously worked as an agent for the Alabama Alcoholic Beverage Control Board and as a member of Bob Riley's security detail.

== Career ==
Taylor began his career in law enforcement in Shelby County for the Alabama Alcoholic Beverage Control Board in 1991. He later moved on to work for the state bureau of investigation. After Stan Stabler announced his resignation as the secretary of the ALEA on April 12, 2017, Kay Ivey selected Taylor to fill the position in an acting capacity. His first outlined priorities as acting secretary were to address the state trooper shortage.

Taylor was officially sworn in to the position on August 11, 2017. When Alabama implemented the STAR ID program, he encouraged citizens to update their driver's licenses.
