= Drug policy of Alabama =

Overview of the drug policy of the U.S. state of Alabama

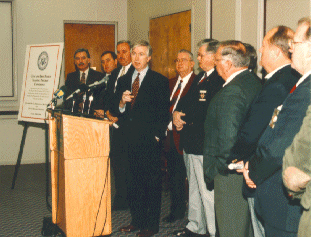
U.S. Representative Bud Cramer announcing an Alabama Drug and Gang Task Force, 1999

The drug policy of Alabama involves the policies, measures and laws set by the Government of Alabama to control substance distribution and abuse.

== By drug ==
In Alabama, possession of any controlled substance is a Class A felony.

=== Alcohol ===
Alabama alcohol sales legality map

The Alabama Alcoholic Beverage Control Board is responsible for licensing and regulating alcohol sales in Alabama.

Prohibition was enacted in Alabama in 1907, with the ban being led by Richmond P. Hobson. Alabama law enforcement actively pursued violators of the law, with 18,000 people being arrested between 1919 and 1933, and 10,000 being trialed.

=== Cannabis ===
If one possesses between 1 kilogram (2.2 lb) and 100 pounds of cannabis, they can be sentenced to at least 3 years in prison, plus a $25,000 fine. If one possesses between 100 and 500 pounds of cannabis, they can be sentenced to at least 15 years in prison, plus a $20,000 fine. If one possesses between 500 and 1000 pounds of cannabis, they can be sentenced to 15 years in prison, plus a $200,000 fine. If one possesses over 1000 pounds of cannabis, they can be sentenced to life in prison.

In early February 2025, state senator Tim Melson introduced a bill to ban intoxicating hemp products.

Alabama schedules cannabis as a Schedule I drug, though medical cannabis was legalized for use by some cancer and autism patients, in 2021, before being banned in 2023, then being unbanned again on March 10, 2025.

=== Methamphetamine ===
In Alabama, if one possesses between 28 and 500 grams or methamphetamine, they can be sentenced to at least 3 years in prison, plus a $50,000 fine. If one possesses between 500 and 1,000 grams (1.0 kg), they can be sentenced to at least 10 years in prison, plus a $100,000 fine. If one possesses between 1000 and 10,000 grams (10 kg), they can be sentenced to at least 25 years, plus a $250,000 fine. If one possesses more than 10000 grams, they can be sentenced to life in prison.

=== Nicotine ===
The Alabama Alcoholic Beverage Control Board is also responsible for the regulation of the sale of nicotine products. In July 2024, state senator Garlan Gudger sponsored the bill "S B2", which would enforce underage nicotine usage.

=== Opioids ===
In Alabama, if one possesses between 4 and 14 grams or heroin or opioids, they can be sentenced to at least 3 years in prison, plus a $50,000 fine. If one possesses between 14 and 28 grams, they can be sentenced to at least 10 years in prison, plus a $100,000 fine. If one possesses between 28 and 56 grams, they can be sentenced to at least 25 years, plus a $500,000 fine. If one possesses more than 56 grams, they can be sentenced to life in prison.

If one possesses between 1 and 2 grams or fentanyl, they can be sentenced to at least 3 years in prison, plus a $50,000 fine. If one possesses between 2 and 4 grams, they can be sentenced to at least 10 years in prison, plus a $100,000 fine. If one possesses between 4 and 8 grams, they can be sentenced to at least 25 years, plus a $500,000 fine. If one possesses more than 8 grams, they can be sentenced to life in prison, plus a $750,000 fine.
