= Montgomery Police Department (Alabama) =

- Abbreviation: MPD
- Motto: Honor - Duty - Loyalty

Agency overview
- Formed: 1820

Jurisdictional structure
- Operations jurisdiction: Montgomery, Alabama, USA
- Map of Montgomery Police Department's jurisdiction
- Area: 156.6 square miles (406 km^{2})
- Population: 205,764
- General nature: Local civilian police

Operational structure
- Headquarters: Montgomery, Alabama
- Officers: 524
- Civilians: 200
- Divisions: 8: Administrative; Criminal Investigation; Municipal Jail; Patrol; Special Operations; Traffic; Training and Recruiting

Website
- Montgomery Police Department

The Montgomery Police Department (MPD) was established in 1820. It is budgeted for 490 sworn officers, however currently possess around 220 and around another 80 support staff. It is headed by Interim Chief of Police James N. Graboys.

== History ==
=== Civil rights era ===
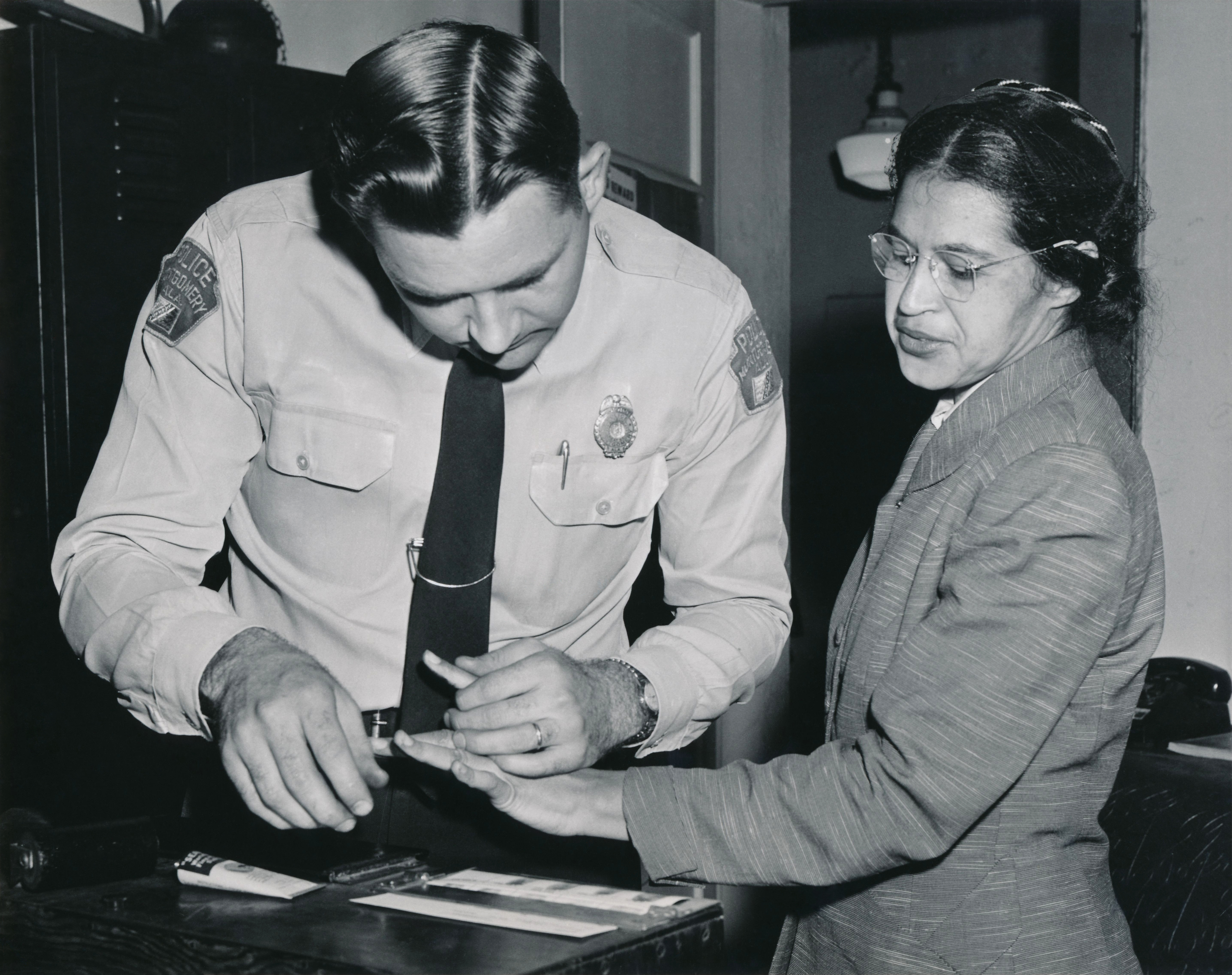
Rosa Parks being fingerprinted by MPD Lieutenant D.H. Lackey on February 22, 1956

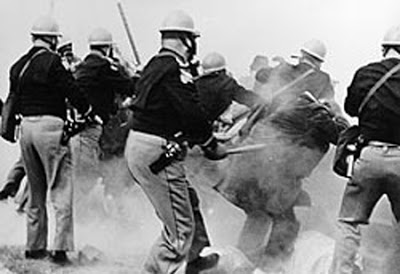
March 7, 1965: Alabama police attack the Selma to Montgomery marchers on "Bloody Sunday"

== Organization ==
The department is divided into a number of divisions, which in turn have a number of bureaus.

The divisions are:

- Administrative
- Criminal Investigative
- Municipal Jail
- Patrol
- Special Operations
- Traffic
- Training and Recruiting

== See also ==
- Freedom Riders in Montgomery
- Shooting of Greg Gunn
- Killing of Bernard Whitehurst
- List of law enforcement agencies in Alabama
