= Evening Journal =

Evening Journal may refer to:

- Evening Journal (Adelaide) (1869–1912), in Adelaide, Australia; later The News
- The News Journal, in Wilmington, Delaware, United States
- New York Evening Journal (1896–1937), merged into the New York Journal-American
- Alabama Journal, United States
