= List of law enforcement agencies in Alabama =

Alabama state flag

This is a list of law enforcement agencies in the U.S. state of Alabama.

According to the US Bureau of Justice Statistics' 2008 Census of State and Local Law Enforcement Agencies, the state had 417 law enforcement agencies employing 11,631 sworn police officers, about 251 for each 100,000 residents.

== State Agencies ==
- Alabama Law Enforcement Agency
- Alabama Department of Conservation and Natural Resources
- Alabama Board of Pardons and Parole
- Alabama State Parks Ranger Service
- Alabama State Lands Security
- Alabama Department of Corrections
- Bureau of Special Investigations
  - Alabama Department of Mental Health Police
- Alabama Securities Commission
- Alabama State Port Authority Police
- Alabama Department of Insurance
  - State Fire Marshal's Office
- Marshals of the Alabama Appellate Courts
- Alabama National Guard Military Police/Security Forces (under state gubernatorial control unless federalized under Title 10 of the United States Code)

== County sheriff agencies ==
- Autauga County Sheriff's Office
- Baldwin County Sheriff's Office
- Bibb County Sheriff's Office
- Blount County Sheriff's Office
- Bullock County Sheriff's Office
- Butler County Sheriff's Office
- Calhoun County Sheriff's Office
- Chambers County Sheriff's Office
- Cherokee County Sheriff's Department
- Chilton County Sheriff's Department
- Choctaw County Sheriff's Department
- Clarke County Sheriff's Office
- Clay County Sheriff's Office
- Cleburne County Sheriff's Office
- Coffee County Sheriff's Office
- Colbert County Sheriff's Department
- Conecuh County Sheriff's Office
- Coosa County Sheriff's Office
- Covington County Sheriff's Office
- Crenshaw County Sheriff's Office
- Cullman County Sheriff's Office
- Dale County Sheriff's Office
- Dallas County Sheriff's Office
- DeKalb County Sheriff's Office
- Elmore County Sheriff's Office
- Escambia County Sheriff's Department
- Etowah County Sheriff's Office
- Fayette County Sheriff's Office
- Franklin County Sheriff's Office
- Geneva County Sheriff's Office
- Greene County Sheriff's Office
- Hale County Sheriff's Office
- Henry County Sheriff's Office
- Houston County Sheriff's Department
- Jackson County Sheriff's Office
- Jefferson County Sheriff's Department
- Lamar County Sheriff's Office
- Lauderdale County Sheriff's Office
- Lawrence County Sheriff's Office
- Lee County Sheriff's Department
- Limestone County Sheriff's Office
- Lowndes County Sheriff's Office
- Macon County Sheriff's Office
- Madison County Sheriff's Department
- Marengo County Sheriff's Office
- Marion County Sheriff's Office
- Marshall County Sheriff's Office
- Mobile County Sheriff's Department
- Monroe County Sheriff's Office
- Montgomery County Sheriff's Office
- Morgan County Sheriff's Office
- Perry County Sheriff's Office
- Pickens County Sheriff's Office
- Pike County Sheriff's Office
- Randolph County Sheriff's Office
- Russell County Sheriff's Office
- Saint Clair County Sheriff's Office
- Shelby County Sheriff's Department
- Sumter County Sheriff's Office
- Talladega County Sheriff's Office
- Tallapoosa County Sheriff's Department
- Tuscaloosa County Sheriff's Office
- Walker County Sheriff's Department
- Washington County Sheriff's Department
- Wilcox County Sheriff's Office
- Winston County Sheriff's Office

== County constable agencies ==
- Barbour County Constable's Office
- Colbert County Constable's Office
- Conecuh County Constable's Office
- Coosa County Constable's Office
- Dallas County Constable's Office
- DeKalb County Constable's Office
- Elmore County Constable's Office
- Etowah County Constable's Office
- Franklin County Constable's Office
- Greene County Constable's Office
- Jackson County Constable's Office
- Jefferson County Constable's Office
- Marengo County Constable's Office
- Marion County Constable's Office
- Mobile County Constable's Office
- Monroe County Constable's Office
- Russell County Constable's Office
- Sumter County Constable's Office
- Talladega County Constable's Office
- Tallapoosa County Constable's Office
- Walker County Constable's Office
- Wilcox County Constable's Office
- Winston County Constable's Office

== Local agencies ==
- Abbeville Police Department
- Adamsville Police Department
- Alabaster Police Department
- Albertville Police Department
- Alexander City Police Department
- Aliceville Police Department
- Altoona Police Department
- Andalusia Police Department
- Anderson Police Department
- Anniston Police Department
- Arab Police Department
- Ardmore Police Department
- Argo Police Department
- Ariton Police Department
- Ashford Police Department
- Ashland Police Department
- Ashville Police Department
- Athens Police Department
- Atmore Police Department
- Attalla Police Department
- Auburn Police Department
- Autaugaville Police Department
- Bakerhill Police Department
- Bay Minette Police Department
- Bayou La Batre Police Department
- Berry Police Department
- Bessemer Police Department
- Birmingham Police Department
- Blountsville Police Department
- Boaz Police Department
- Brantley Police Department
- Brent Police Department
- Brewton Police Department
- Bridgeport Police Department
- Brookwood Police Department
- Brundidge Police Department
- Butler Police Department
- Calera Police Department
- Camden Police Department
- Camp Hill Police Department
- Carbon Hill Police Department
- Carrollton Police Department
- Castleberry Police Department
- Cedar Bluff Police Department
- Centre Police Department
- Centreville Police Department
- Chatom Police Department
- Cherokee Police Department
- Chickasaw Police Department
- Childersburg Police Department
- Citronelle Police Department
- Clanton Police Department
- Clayton Police Department
- Clio Police Department
- Collinsville Police Department
- Columbiana Police Department
- Cordova Police Department
- Cottonwood Police Department
- Courtland Police Department
- Creola Police Department
- Crossville Police Department
- Cullman Police Department
- Dadeville Police Department
- Daleville Police Department
- Daphne Police Department
- Dauphin Island Police Department
- Decatur Police Department
- Demopolis Police Department
- Dora Police Department
- Dothan Police Department
- Double Springs Police Department
- Douglas Police Department
- East Brewton Police Department
- Eclectic Police Department
- Elba Police Department
- Elberta Police Department
- Enterprise Police Department
- Eufaula Police Department
- Eutaw Police Department
- Evergreen Police Department
- Excel Police Department
- Fairfield Police Department
- Fairhope Police Department
- Falkville Police Department
- Fayette Police Department
- Flomaton Police Department
- Florala Police Department
- Florence Police Department
- Foley Police Department
- Fort Deposit Police Department
- Fort Payne Police Department
- Frisco City Police Department
- Fultondale Police Department
- Fyffe Police Department
- Gadsden Police Department
- Gardendale Police Department
- Geneva Police Department
- Georgiana Police Department
- Geraldine Police Department
- Glencoe Police Department (Alabama)
- Goodwater Police Department
- Gordo Police Department
- Grant Police Department
- Graysville Police Department
- Greensboro Police Department
- Greenville Police Department
- Grove Hill Police Department
- Guin Police Department
- Gulf Shores Police Department
- Guntersville Police Department
- Haleyville Police Department
- Hamilton Police Department
- Hanceville Police Department
- Harpersville Police Department
- Hartford Police Department
- Hartselle Police Department
- Headland Police Department
- Heflin Police Department
- Helena Police Department
- Henagar Police Department
- Hokes Bluff Police Department
- Hollywood Police Department
- Homewood Police Department
- Hoover Police Department
- Hueytown Police Department
- Huntsville Police Department
- Irondale Police Department
- Jackson Police Department
- Jacksonville Police Department
- Jasper Police Department
- Jemison Police Department
- Kennedy Police Department
- Kimberly Police Department
- Kinston Police Department
- Lafayette Police Department
- Lake View Police Department
- Lanett Police Department
- Leeds Police Department
- Leighton Police Department
- Level Plains Police Department
- Lincoln Police Department
- Linden Police Department
- Lineville Police Department
- Littleville Police Department
- Livingston Police Department
- Lockhart Police Department
- Louisville Police Department
- Loxley Police Department
- Luverne Police Department
- Madison Police Department
- Maplesville Police Department
- Margaret Police Department
- Marion Police Department
- Mentone Police Department
- Midfield Police Department
- Midland City Police Department
- Millbrook Police Department
- Millport Police Department
- Millry Police Department
- Mobile Police Department
- Monroeville Police Department
- Montevallo Police Department
- Montgomery Police Department
- Moody Police Department
- Morris Police Department
- Moulton Police Department
- Moundville Police Department
- Mount Vernon Police Department
- Mountain Brook Police Department
- Muscle Shoals Police Department
- Myrtlewood Police Department
- Napier Field Police Department
- New Brockton Police Department
- New Hope Police Department
- New Site Police Department
- Newton Police Department
- North Courtland Police Department
- Northport Police Department *Owens Cross Roads Police Department
- Oakman Police Department
- Odenville Police Department
- Ohatchee Police Department
- Oneonta Police Department
- Opelika Police Department
- City of Opp Police Department
- Orange Beach Police Department
- Oxford Police Department
- Ozark Police Department
- Parrish Police Department
- Pelham Police Department
- Pell City Police Department
- Pennington Police Department
- Phenix City Police Department
- Phil Campbell Police Department
- Piedmont Police Department
- Pine Hill Police Department
- Prattville Police Department
- Priceville Police Department
- Prichard Police Department
- Ragland Police Department
- Rainbow City Police Department
- Rainsville Police Department
- Red Bay Police Department
- Red Level Police Department
- Reform Police Department
- Riverside Police Department
- Roanoke Police Department
- Robertsdale Police Department
- Rogersville Police Department
- Russellville Police Department
- Samson Police Department
- Saraland Police Department
- Sardis City Police Department
- Satsuma Police Department
- Scottsboro Police Department
- Section Police Department
- Selma Police Department
- Sheffield Police Department
- Sipsey Police Department
- Slocomb Police Department
- Snead Police Department
- Southside Police Department
- Spanish Fort Police Department
- Springville Police Department
- Stevenson Police Department
- Sulligent Police Department
- Sumiton Police Department
- Sylacauga Police Department
- Sylvania Police Department
- Talladega Police Department
- Tallassee Police Department
- Tarrant Police Department
- Thomaston Police Department
- Thomasville Police Department
- Thorsby Police Department
- Town Creek Police Department
- Town of Bon Air Police Department
- Triana Police Department
- Trinity Police Department
- Troy Police Department
- Trussville Police Department
- Tuscaloosa Police Department
- Tuscumbia Police Department
- Tuskegee Police Department
- Union Springs Police Department
- Uniontown Police Department
- Valley Police Department
- Valley Head Police Department
- Vance Police Department
- Vernon Police Department
- Vestavia Hills Police Department
- Vincent Police Department
- Wadley Police Department
- Warrior Police Department
- Weaver Police Department
- Wedowee Police Department
- West Blocton Police Department
- Wetumpka Police Department
- Wilsonville Police Department
- Winfield Police Department
- York Police Department

== College and university agencies ==
- Alabama A & M University Department of Public Safety
- Alabama State University Police Department
- Auburn University Department of Public Safety
- Birmingham Southern College Police Department
- Calhoun Community College Police Department
- Faulkner University Police Department
- Gadsden State Community College Security and Safety Office
- Jacksonville State University Police Department
- Jefferson State Community College Police Department
- Lawson State Community College Police Department
- Miles College Police Department
- Russell Community College Public Safety Department
- Samford University Police Department
- Southern Union Community College Public Safety Department
- Stillman College Police Department
- Tuskegee University Campus Police
- Troy University Police Department
- University of Alabama Police Department
- University of Alabama at Birmingham Police Department
- University of Alabama in Huntsville Police Department
- University of Mobile Department of Public Safety
- University of Montevallo Department of Public Safety
- University of North Alabama Police Department
- University of South Alabama Police Department
- University of West Alabama Police Department
- Wallace State Community College Police Department

== Defunct, Federal and Local, Legislative, State agencies ==
The Alabama Law Enforcement Agency was formed on 1 January 2015 by the merger of the following state law enforcement agencies:

Federal law enforcement agencies operating within Alabama

- ATF
- List of FBI Field Offices#Alabama
- DEA
- Alabama Department of Homeland Security
- Alabama Department of Public Safety
- Alabama Bureau of Investigation
- Alabama Fusion Center
- Alabama Criminal Justice Information Center
- Alabama Marine Police
- Alabama Alcoholic Beverage Control Board Enforcement
- Alabama Department of Revenue Enforcement
- Alabama Forestry Commission Investigations
- Alabama Agricultural and Industry Investigations
- Alabama Public Service Commission Enforcement
- Alabama Office of Prosecution Service Computer Forensics

== See also ==
- Law enforcement in the United States
- Federal law enforcement in the United States
- List of United States state and local law enforcement agencies
