= Grover C. Hall =

American journalist

Grover Cleveland Hall Sr. (January 11, 1888 – January 9, 1941) was an American newspaper editor. At the Montgomery Advertiser in Montgomery, Alabama, he garnered national attention and won a Pulitzer Prize during the 1920s for his editorials that criticized the Ku Klux Klan.

== Newspaper career ==
Hall was born in Haleburg, Alabama, near the Georgia and Florida borders, and educated in the state's country schools. Grover was ten in 1898, when his older brother William Theodore Hall started newspaper work in Dothan, Alabama, also in the southeastern corner of the state. W.T. Hall was editor of the Dothan Eagle from 1905 to 1924 (his death) and Grover started work under him in 1905. There he was a printer's devil; from 1907 to 1910 he worked in editorial positions at the Enterprise Ledger (Enterprise, AL), Dothan Daily Siftings, Selma Times, and at the Pensacola Journal, where he wrote editorials in 1910. That year he moved to be associate editor of the Montgomery Advertiser in the state capital, where he married in 1912, became chief editor in 1926, and was appointed probate judge in 1933.

Today the Montgomery Advertiser says that it "waged war on the resurgent Ku Klux Klan" during the 1920s. Hall won the annual Pulitzer Prize for Editorial Writing in 1928 for that work. The official citation specified "his editorials against gangsterism, floggings and racial and religious intolerance." Hall had previously supported the Ku Klux Klan until it challenged the state's dominant political establishment, the Big Mule/Black Belt coalition, in the election of 1926.

Hall endorsed Al Smith for U.S. President in 1928 (against Hoover). He was a friend of H. L. Mencken, editor of The Baltimore Sun, and they exchanged many letters, some of which "inspired Hall to think critically about the South". Mencken did not support democracy but theirs was "a remarkable coincidence of views" on less political matters, according to the Hall family biographer (quoted in the review).

Late in the 1930s, Hall argued for release of the black Scottsboro Boys who were commonly defended only in the North.

== The Egregious Gentile ==
On December 4, 1938, the Advertiser published Hall's editorial "The Egregious Gentile Called to Account". It carried the subtitle: "Clinical notes on his lack of gallantry and sportsmanship, his bad mental habits, his tactlessness, his lack of imagination, his poor discernment, his faults as citizen and neighbor, his gullibility and arrogance." Hall observed that "1,000,001 articles and books" have defended the Jew. "Fortunately he does not stand in need of defense. But I can think of 100 reasons why his Gentile brother, usually ignored by critics, invites and deserves arraignment before the bar of his own conscience. ... The earth swarms with men who think they are experts on the Jew. Nobody attempts a critical estimate of the Gentile as a Gentile. ... I, for one, marvel at this escape of the Gentile from accountability and justice." He concluded that in order to save "the lovely pillars of civilization we shall have to purge ourselves. That striding Colossus known as the Nordic Gentile must be born again."

"The Egregious Gentile" was published in the U.S. Congressional Record on January 17, 1939. It was issued by the New York City League for Industrial Democracy as pages 27–40 of a 40-page pamphlet, with a longer article by the editor of The New Republic.

The pamphlet opened with a two-page dedication to the recently deceased Baruch Charney Vladeck and was sold for 15 cents.

== Family ==
Hall married Claudia English in 1912 and they had one son, Grover Cleveland Jr. His wife suffered an emotional breakdown in 1929 and Hall died of a bleeding ulcer in 1941 (from a scholarly review of the family biography, An Alabama Newspaper Tradition).

Their son, Grover Cleveland Hall Jr. (1915 – 1971) followed in his father's footsteps at the Montgomery Advertiser, and later was instrumental in New York Times Co. v. Sullivan, a lawsuit that came to define defamation in the United States.
