= List of killings by law enforcement officers in the United States, February 2016 =

This is a list of people reported killed by non-military law enforcement officers in the United States in February 2016, whether in the line of duty or not, and regardless of reason or method. The listing documents the occurrence of a death, making no implications regarding wrongdoing or justification on the part of the person killed or officer involved. Killings are arranged by date of the incident that caused death. Different death dates, if known, are noted in the description. The table below lists 97 people.

== February 2016 ==
Date	Name (age) of deceased	State (city)	Description
2016-02-29	Denkins, Akiel (24)	North Carolina (Raleigh)	Police in southeast Raleigh attempted to serve a warrant on a felony drug charge. An officer, Senior Officer D.C. Twiddy, chased the subject on foot before shooting him. In a report, Twiddy said Denkins pulled a handgun from his waistband during a struggle.
2016-02-28	Hicks, Earl (44)	South Dakota (Rapid City)	
2016-02-28	Grissom, Nathan (41)	Alabama (Ashville)	At about 4:30 p.m., four officers responded to a woman's 911 call about a domestic dispute. Grissom took out a gun, according to police. Officers approached him and shots were fired, killing him.
2016-02-27	Hernandez, Fernando (23)	Texas (Floresville)	
2016-02-26	Fryer, Abraham (35)	South Dakota (Rapid City)	
2016-02-26	Spencer, Kionte (18)	Virginia (Roanoke County)	At about 7:15 p.m., authorities received a call about a black male wearing a bandanna and hoodie waving a gun in a parking lot. Officers say they told Spencer several times to stop walking away from them, but he would not, according to police. Police say there were two attempts to tase Spencer, but neither were effective. Two officers fired shots at Spencer after they say he turned toward them. The weapon, which turned out to be a BB gun, was still in Spencer's hand when he was shot, according to police. He was shot twice: once in the hip area and once in the collarbone. He later died at a hospital.
2016-02-25	Zoucha, Alex (31)	Nebraska (Bellevue)	
2016-02-25	Conti, Tristan (19)	Nevada (Silver Springs)	
2016-02-25	Ford, Cedric Larry (38)	Kansas (Hesston)	Ford was armed with a semi-automatic rifle and semi-automatic pistol as he began randomly shooting. His six-mile trail of violence lasted just 26 minutes, during which he killed three people and injured 14. He stole a truck at Excel Industries, a lawn-care company in Hesston, and the first police officer on the scene shot him dead.
2016-02-25	Gunn, Greg (58)	Alabama (Montgomery)	Police say the incident began at around 3:20 a.m. when an officer, Aaron Smith, noticed a man, later identified as Gunn, walking in the area and stopped to talk to him. A struggle occurred between the officer and the man, with the officer tasing Gunn three times, beating him with his baton, and firing seven shots, five of which hit Gunn and killed him, according to the police investigation. Gunn was believed to have been carrying a painting pole or stick, but no fingerprints were found on the pole. On March 2, Smith was charged with murder in Gunn's death. On March 23, 2017, judge James Anderson recused himself for impropriety reasons, his son working for a law firm that represents Smith in a federal lawsuit filed by the Gunn family.
2016-02-25	Miller, Luke (37)	Colorado (Evans)	After investigation into a trespassing report, in which Evans police were assisted by the Greeley and LaSalle police departments and the Weld County Sheriff's Office, the suspect fired a weapon at an officer and fled. Later, the suspect reportedly shouted to officers, "Shoot me, kill me!" and raised his weapon at officers. Initial reports indicate two Greeley police officers and one LaSalle officer fired their weapons at the suspect.
2016-02-24	Wirth, Martin (58)	Colorado (Bailey)	
2016-02-24	Keil, Robert (16)	Missouri (Blue Springs)	
2016-02-24	Garcia, Francisco (26)	California (Norwalk)	
2016-02-24	Davis, Christopher (21)	Wisconsin (East Troy)	
2016-02-24	Rivera, Victor (27)	Arizona (Phoenix)	Police were attempting to stop Rivera, who was found in a stolen vehicle. Officers who approached the car were assaulted and Rivera even tried to drive off, pinning one between the cars. Police say a total of five cars were damaged when the suspect rammed them. One of the officers fired a shot at Rivera. He was then taken to the hospital, where he died from his injuries.
2016-02-23	Buckner, Alex (26)	Arizona (Glendale)	
2016-02-23	Stevenson, Travis (48)	Louisiana (Baton Rouge)	
2016-02-23	Gleason, Angel (36)	California (Ripon)	
2016-02-23	Ramos, Baltazar (39)	Texas (Houston)	
2016-02-22	Gonzalez, Gerardino (33)	Colorado (Denver)	
2016-02-22	Long, Jamie (45)	California (Bakersfield)	
2016-02-22	Green, David (38)	Texas (Mission)	
2016-02-22	Loch, Rouven (22)	Ohio (Fairborn)	
2016-02-22	Lane, Thomas (37)	Connecticut (West Haven)	
2016-02-21	Homer, Sherrisa (36)	Arizona (Phoenix)	
2016-02-21	Michael, Kisha (31)	California (Inglewood)	
2016-02-21	Sandlin, Marquintan (32)	California (Inglewood)	
2016-02-21	Kruger, Patricia (38)	Alaska (Houston)	
2016-02-21	Taylor, Che (46)	Washington (Seattle)	Taylor, who was prohibited from possessing a gun because of his status as a felon, was seen with a holstered handgun. Seattle police report that Taylor was ordered to the ground near a vehicle he was exiting, and that he reached for his handgun in the process. Police later publicized Taylor's criminal record in a press release, drawing criticism in the community.
2016-02-20	Camacho-Alvarado, Edgar (23)	New Mexico (Albuquerque)	
2016-02-20	Rendon, Danny (30)	California (Anaheim)	
2016-02-20	Perea, Marcos (41)	Seattle, Washington	After shooting his former girlfriend to death at an aftercare facility, Perea led officers on a vehicle chase, shooting at them as they pursued. The police disabled Perea's vehicle with spike strips, at which point he got out and fired at officers. He was killed when officers returned fire.
2016-02-20	Lambert, Charles Lee (45)	Mississippi (Tishomingo County)	On Friday evening local and state law enforcement responded to a dispute call from a property at remote County Road 201. A six-hour standoff developed as armed family father Lambert refused to leave his home and surrender to the officials. In the early hours of Saturday a tactical team entered the building, which led to an exchange of gunfire in which Lambert and 44-year-old agent James Lee Tartt were killed and three other officers injured.
2016-02-19	Moses, Justin (35)	Utah (Odgen)	
2016-02-19	Dugger, Curtis (31)	Tennessee (Elizabethton)	
2016-02-18	Reyes, Oscar (35)	California (Santa Ana)	
2016-02-18	Quintanilla, Jose (30)	California (Santa Ana)	
2016-02-18	Padron, Ronnie (32)	Texas (Reno)	
2016-02-18	Noel, Joseph (25)	Georgia (Commerce)	
2016-02-17	Gaston, Paul (37)	Ohio (Cincinnati)	
2016-02-16	Dickens, Shawn (30)	Arkansas (Mena)	
2016-02-16	Meikle, Destry (48)	Missouri (Republic)	
2016-02-16	Andrews, Christopher (52)	Connecticut (Fairfield)	Two of Andrews's kids called the police after he started attacking their mother and Andrews's wife. When officers arrived, Andrews approached them with the knife and was shot.
2016-02-15	Cardenas, Inocencio (38)	Texas (Donna)	
2016-02-15	Witt, Brandon (39)	California (Yorba Linda)	
2016-02-15	Sauceda, Guadalupe (52)	New Mexico (Jal)	
2016-02-14	Jaradat, Rammy (26)	California (Los Angeles)	
2016-02-14	Stoddart, Marc (50)	Florida (Bradenton)	
2016-02-14	Rodriguez, Eduardo (29)	California (East Los Angeles)	
2016-02-13	Smith, Calvin (22)	Louisiana (Baton Rouge)	
2016-02-13	Yahia, Ali (29)	Iowa (Urbandale)	
2016-02-13	Perkins, Dyzhawn (19)	Virginia (Arvonia)	
2016-02-13	Roquemore, Calin (24)	Texas (Beckville)	
2016-02-12	Fowler, Johnathan (32)	Georgia (College Park)	
2016-02-12	Watson, David (53)	Texas (Fort Worth)	
2016-02-12	Ridgeway, Sahlah (32)	New York (Syracuse)	
2016-02-12	Ross, Jerand (24)	Georgia (Riverdale)	
2016-02-12	Fanfan, Peter (29)	Massachusetts (Dorchester)	At 10:35 a.m., police responded to a 911 call for a person shot. Police first spotted Fanfan, who was helping a wounded man down the street, officials said. Fanfan allegedly opened fire as the officer was getting out of his car. According to a witness, the officer shouted three times for the man to put the gun down and then returned fire. A gun was recovered at the scene, police said.
2016-02-11	Jackson, Alijah (35)	North Carolina (Maiden)	
2016-02-11	Quinn, Matthew (45)	California (Lancaster)	
2016-02-11	Barry, Mohamed (30)	Ohio (Columbus)	Barry, a migrant from Guinea who had been investigated by the FBI for Islamist sympathies, attacked patrons in a Middle Eastern restaurant with a machete while shouting "Allahu Akbar!", fled, and was shot and killed while attacking police with a machete and a smaller knife.
2016-02-10	Birkeland, John (52)	Minnesota (Roseville)	
2016-02-10	Nageak, Vincent (36)	Alaska (Barrow)	
2016-02-10	Vessels, Timothy (41)	Kentucky (Louisville)	
2016-02-10	Evans, David Bryan (67 or 68)	Maryland (Abingdon)	Harford County deputies responded to a call made at 11:46 a.m. from the Panera Bread near Emmorton Road concerning a potentially wanted subject. The first deputy entering the restaurant approached the suspect and was shot without warning after asking him a simple question. After Evans fled through the backdoor a second deputy, following directions from witnesses and spotting him in the vicinity, was fatally shot as well. At least two other deputies then fired several shots at Evans and killed him. There were two outstanding warrants for Evans, one from Florida for assaulting an officer.
2016-02-10	Bertoni, Anthony (56)	Texas (Kemp)	Bertoni allegedly shot his neighbor and then barricaded himself inside his rural Henderson County home. There was a stand-off, and Bertoni apparently came out shooting. He was shot and killed.
2016-02-09	Najera, Gustavo (22)	California (Anaheim)	
2016-02-09	Yanagawa, Scottie (29)	Hawaii (Hilo)	
2016-02-09	Roman, Nathan (10)	New York (Latham)	
2016-02-09	Roman, Deborah (44)	New York (Latham)	
2016-02-08	Harris, Eric (22)	Louisiana (New Orleans)	
2016-02-08	Joseph, David (17)	Texas (Austin)	Joseph was naked and ran towards a police officer and was shot.
2016-02-08	Longer, Shalamar (33)	Pennsylvania (Chester)	At 2:13 a.m., police attempted to initiate a traffic stop of a car driven by Longer, for a burned-out license plate light. Police say Longer took off, leading police on a chase before jumping out of the car and pointing a gun at officers. Six officers drew their weapons and fired about 100 rounds, killing Longer.
2016-02-07	Laniado, Michael (27)	New Jersey (Toms River)	
2016-02-07	Collins, Marese (23)	Ohio (Columbus)	
2016-02-07	Luchsinger, Phillip (36)	Arkansas (Austin)	
2016-02-06	Mendez, Jose (16)	California (Los Angeles)	
2016-02-06	Davis, Stephen (47)	Ohio (Kenton)	Davis, a Kenton resident with a criminal record, engaged officer Skyler Newfer, who responded to a dispute call, with a long rifle. Newfer was shot twice in the buttocks while trying to take cover behind his vehicle. In the ensuing chase out of the town in a north westerly direction on State Rt. 309 Davis stopped twice to exchange gunfire with officers. He apparently died of received gunshot wounds at the intersection of County Road 106 and SR 309 – about 2.2 miles away from Kenton central.
2016-02-05	Fitzgerald, Blake (30)	Florida (Milton)	
2016-02-05	Celestine, Wendell (37)	California (Antioch)	
2016-02-05	Thibodeaux, Emily (23)	Louisiana (Addis)	
2016-02-05	Strickland, Vinson (51)	North Carolina (Harmony)	
2016-02-05	Barawis, Ronald (38)	Hawaii (Hilo)	
2016-02-05	Clarke, Kayden (24)	Arizona (Mesa)	Police responded to a call claiming that Clarke was suicidal. They shot him when he threatened to hurt himself while holding a knife.
2016-02-05	Ferry, Phillip (55)	Oregon (Seaside)	Following up on an arrest warrant, officers Gooding and David confronted Ferry. Ferry resisted, prompting Davidson to use his taser. Still conscious, Ferry responded by fatally shooting Gooding. Upon seeing this, Davidson shot Ferry three times.
2016-02-04	Leroy, Hector (43)	Texas (El Paso)	
2016-02-04	Hirko, Thomas (54)	Ohio (Perry)	
2016-02-04	Scott, Harless (47)	Missouri (Kansas City)	
2016-02-04	Scott, Antronie (36)	Texas (San Antonio)	
2016-02-03	Neuman, John (53)	Oklahoma (Okmulgee)	
2016-02-03	Dubrino, Christian (31)	Florida (Ocala)	
2016-02-03	Gassman, Raymond (22)	South Dakota (Rosebud)	
2016-02-02	Molinaro, Joe (34)	Pennsylvania (Carbondale)	
2016-02-02	Prescott, Justin (30)	California (Cordova)	
2016-02-01	Alvarado, Edgar (21)	New Mexico (Albuquerque)	
2016-02-01	John, Peter (36)	Washington, DC	

== See also ==
- Death in custody § United States
- Henry A. Wallace Police Crime Public Database
- List of cases of police brutality
- List of countries with annual rates and counts for killings by law enforcement officers
- List of law enforcement officers killed in the line of duty in the United States
- List of law enforcement officers convicted for an on-duty killing in the United States
- List of shootings by US immigration agents
- List of police reforms related to the George Floyd protests
- List of unarmed African Americans killed by law enforcement officers in the United States
- Lists of killings by law enforcement officers
- Police brutality in the United States
- Police misconduct § United States
- Police riot § United States
- Police use of deadly force in the United States
