= Dallas Kinney =

American photojournalist

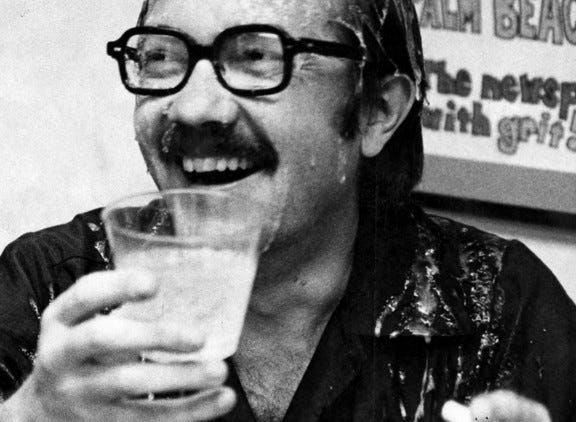
Kinney celebrating after winning the 1970 Pulitzer Prize in Feature Photography

Dallas Kinney (born 1937 in Buckeye, Hardin County, Iowa), is a photojournalist who won the 1970 Pulitzer Prize in Feature Photography for his photographs of Florida migrant workers for The Palm Beach Post.

24 of the photographs of the set Migration to Misery that won the 1970 Pulitzer Prize in Feature Photography, as originally published in The Palm Beach Post

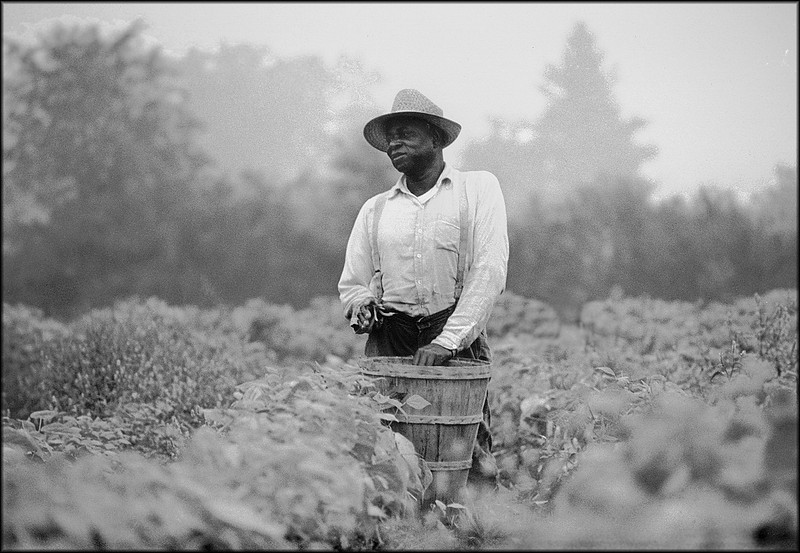

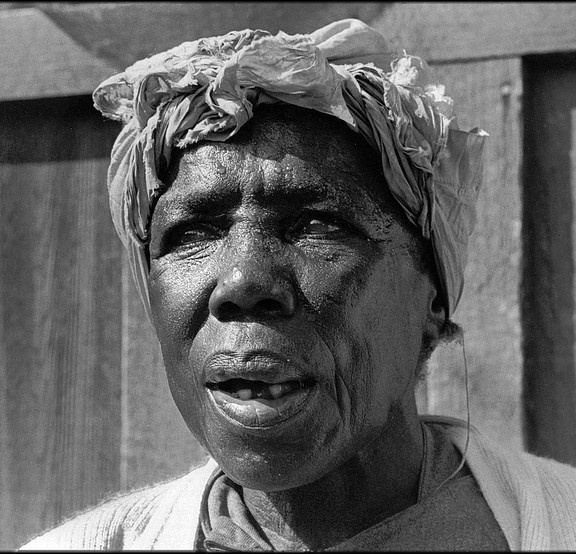

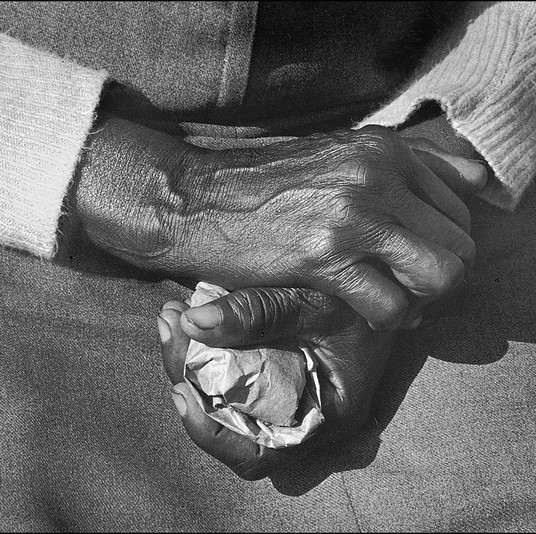

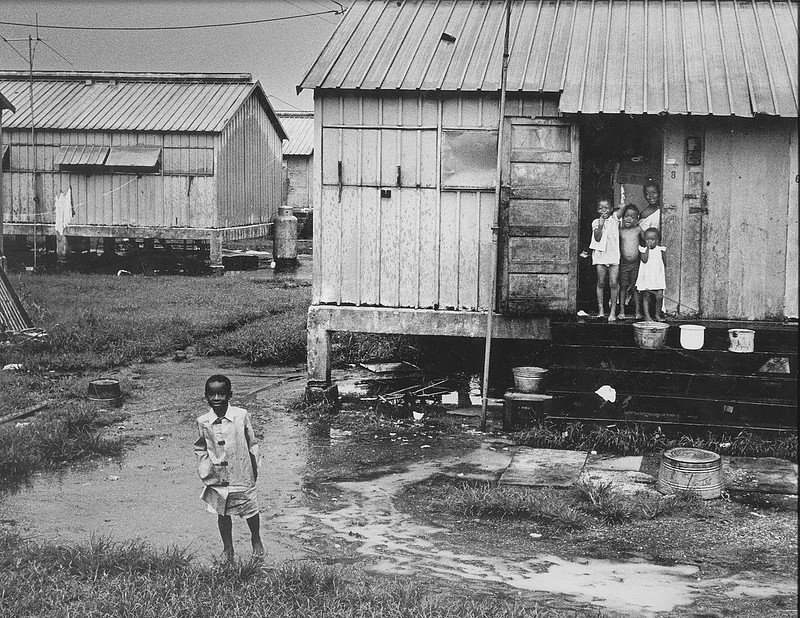

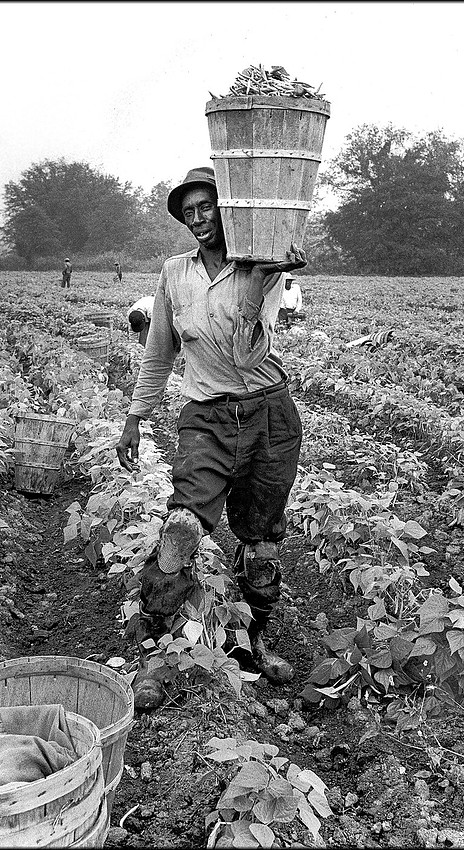

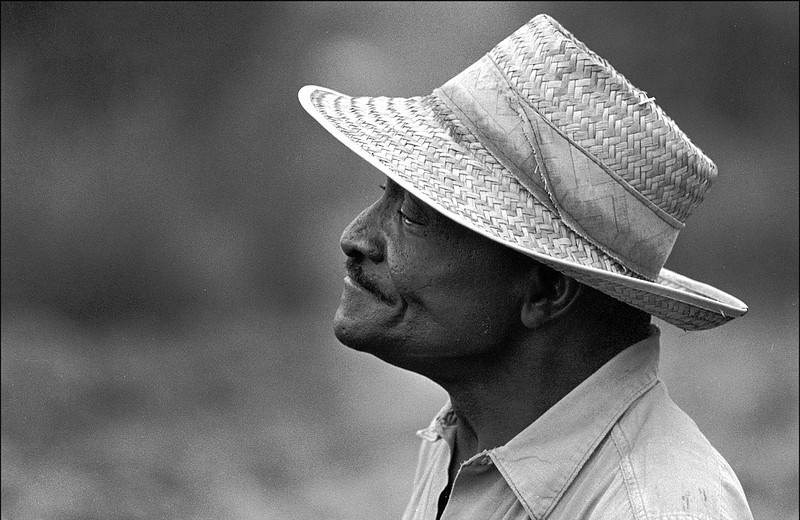

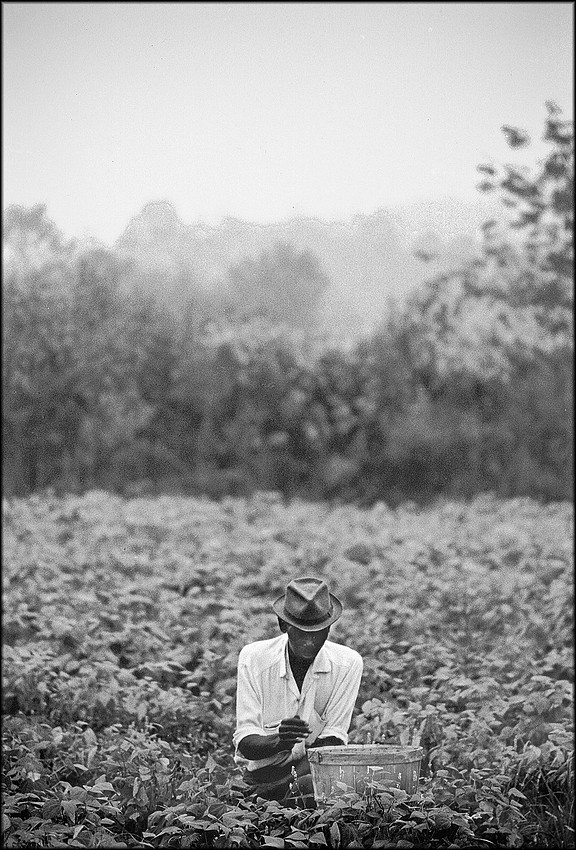

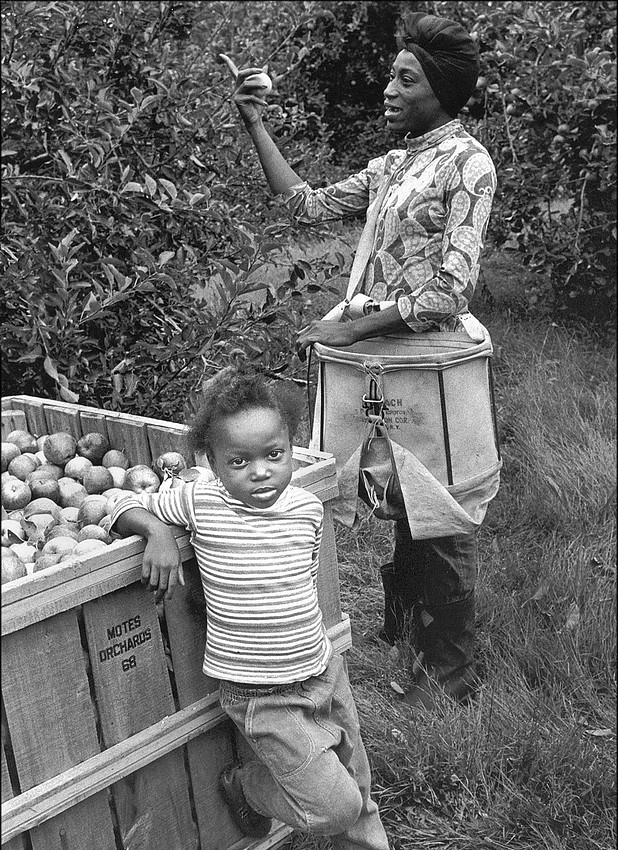

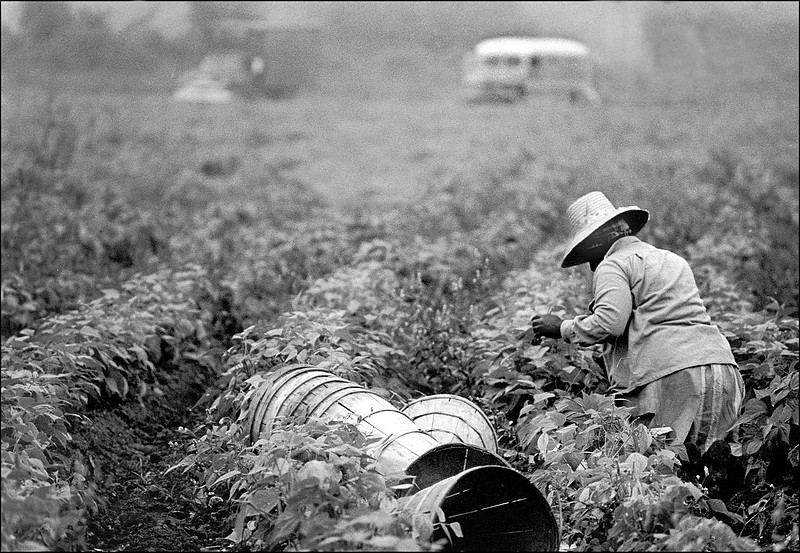

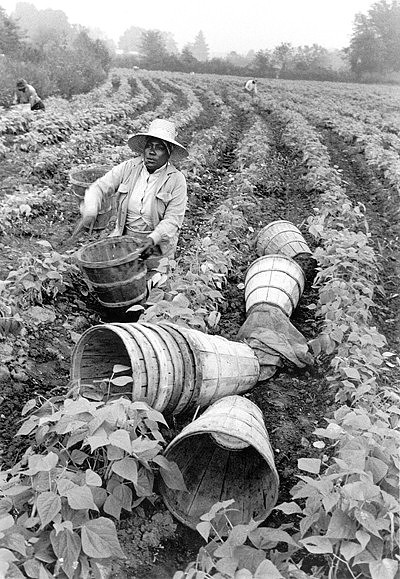

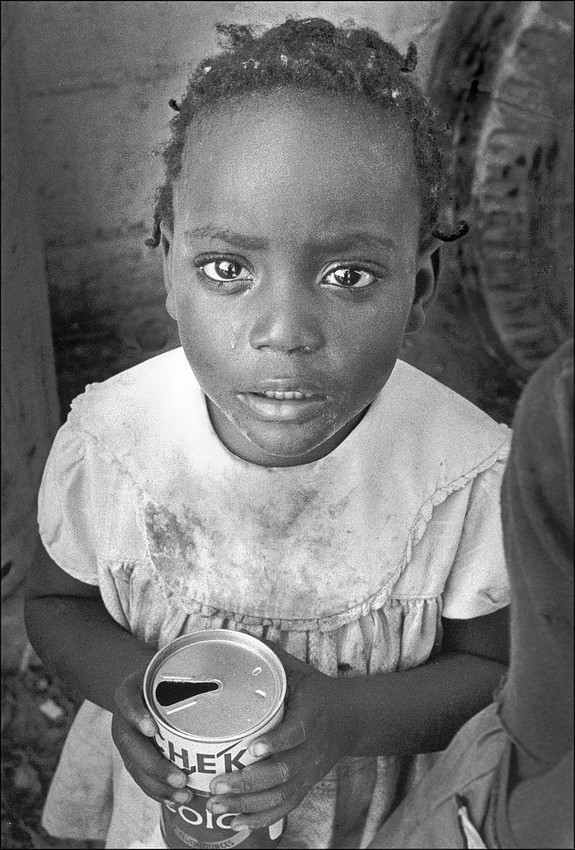

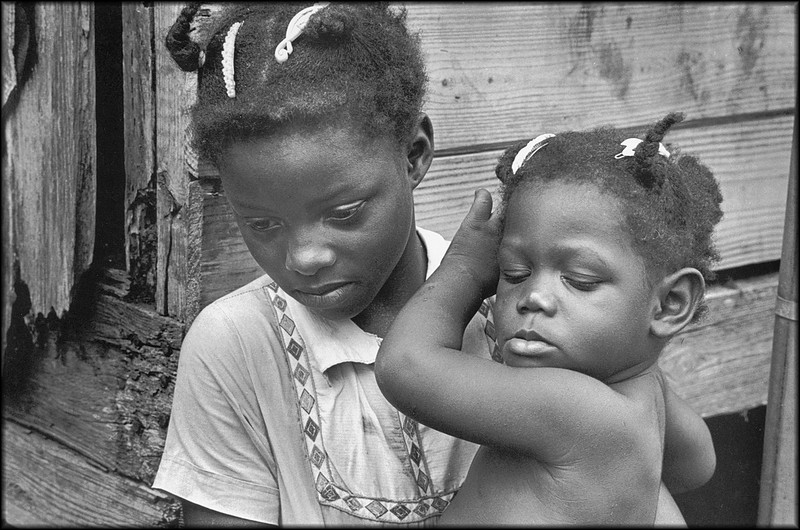

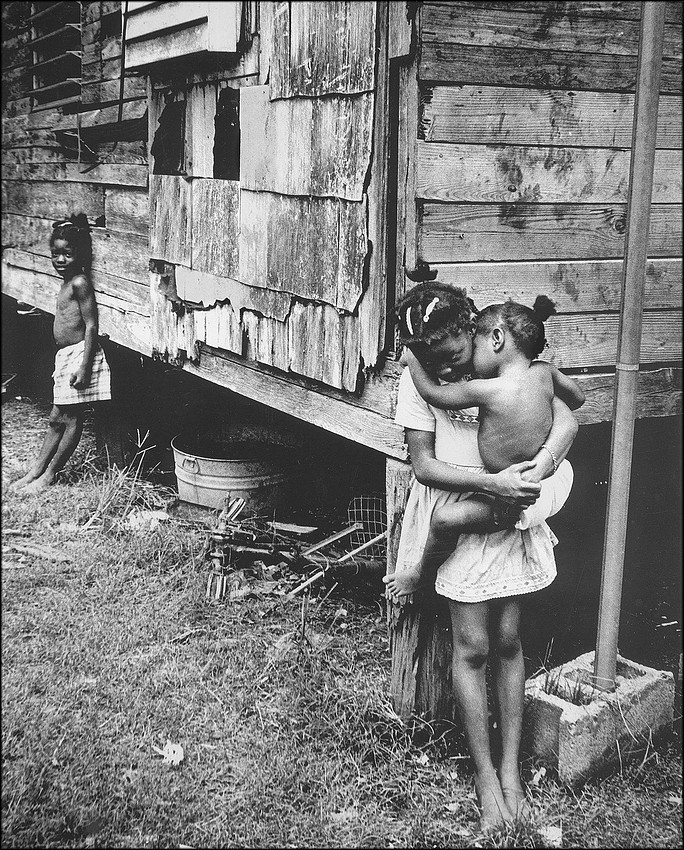

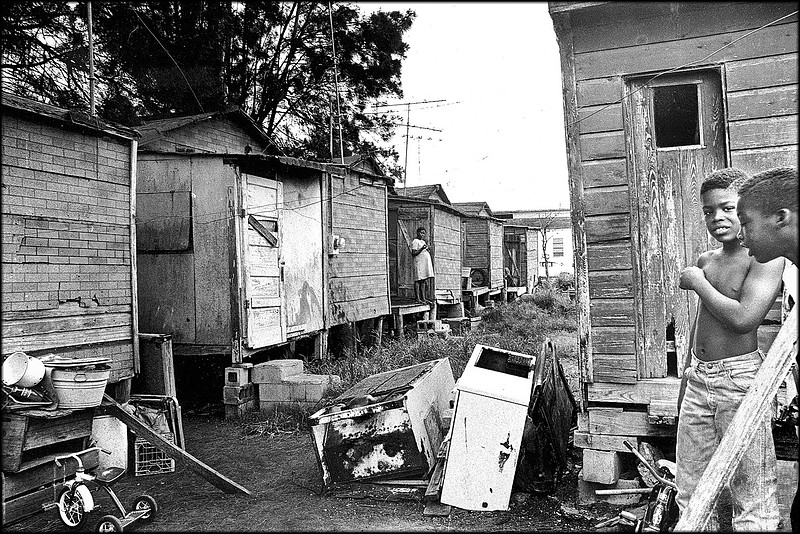

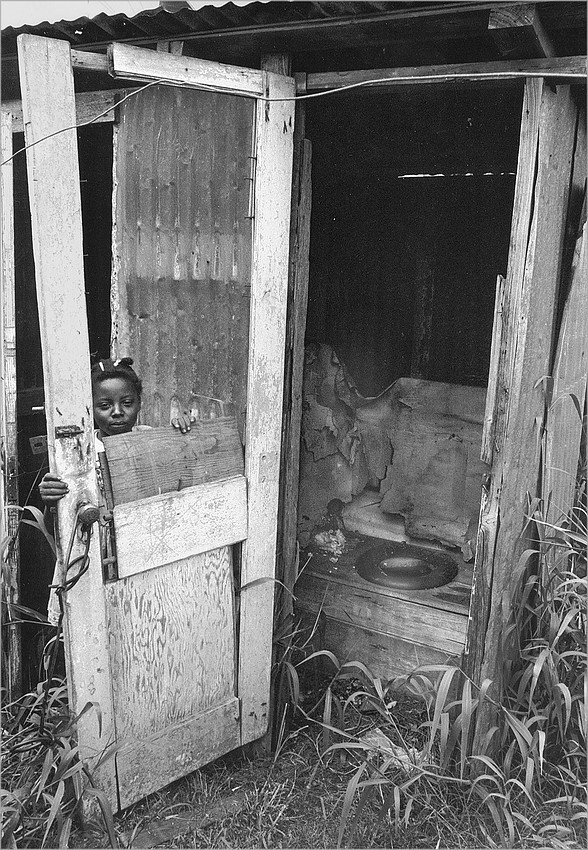

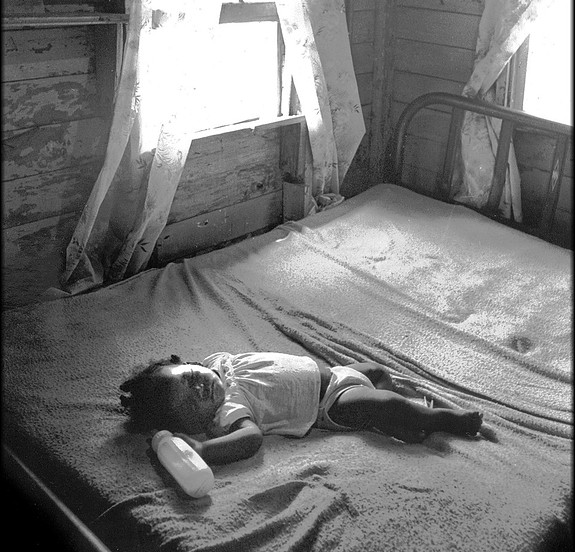

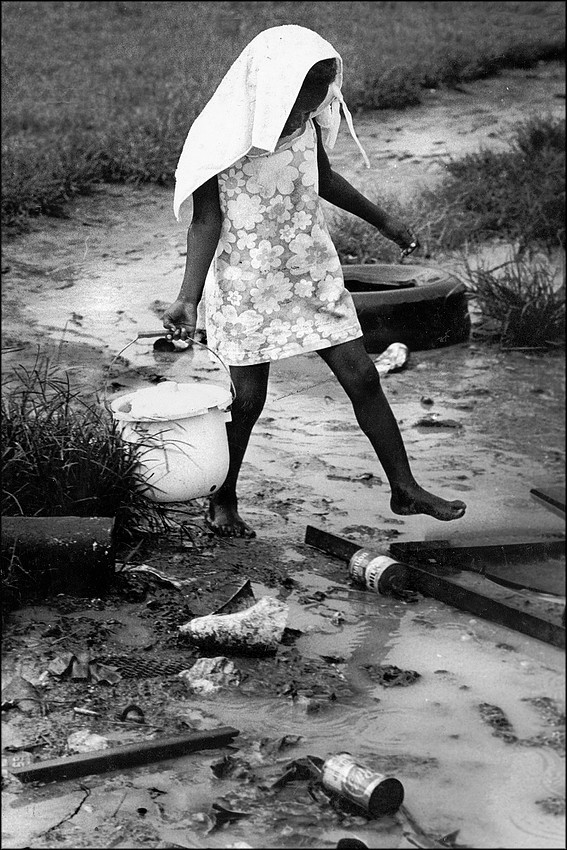

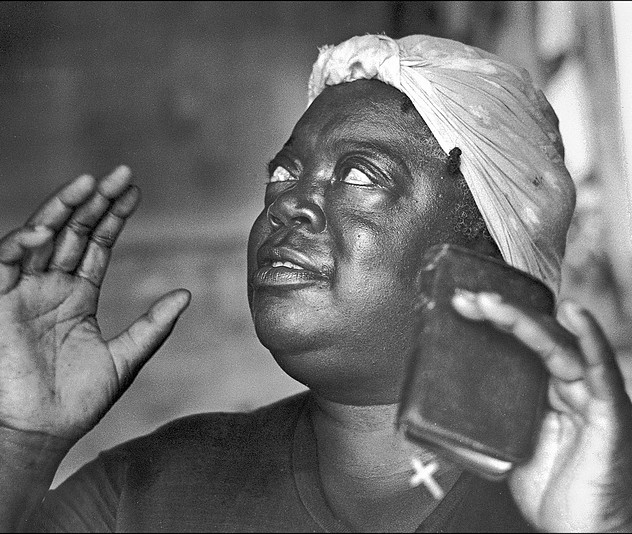

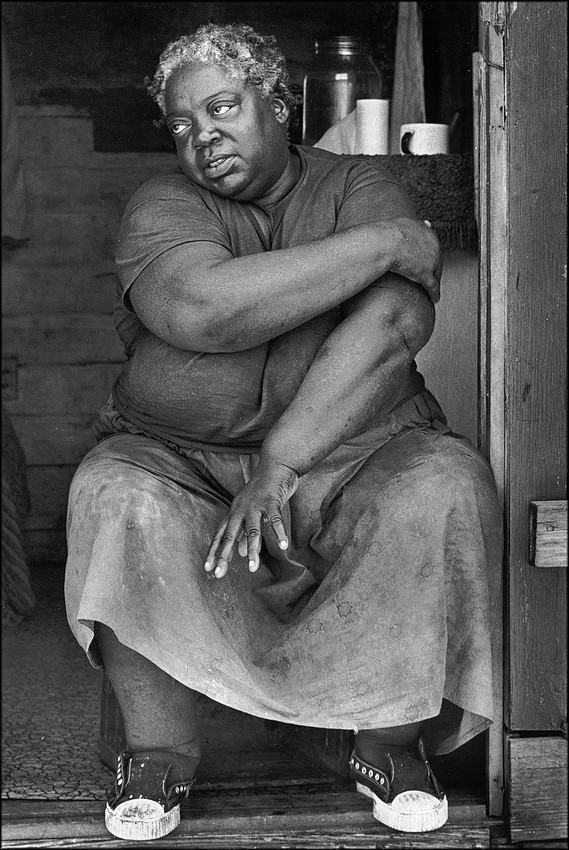

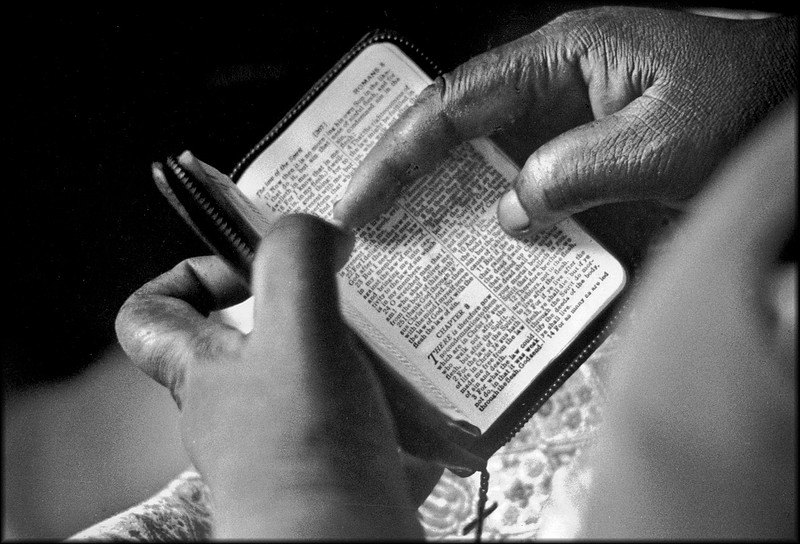

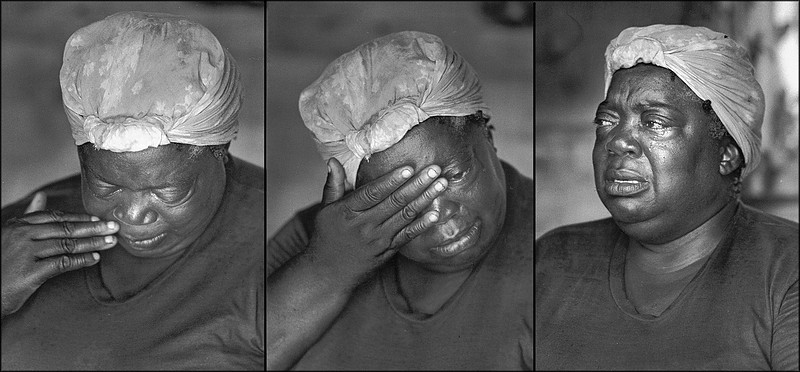

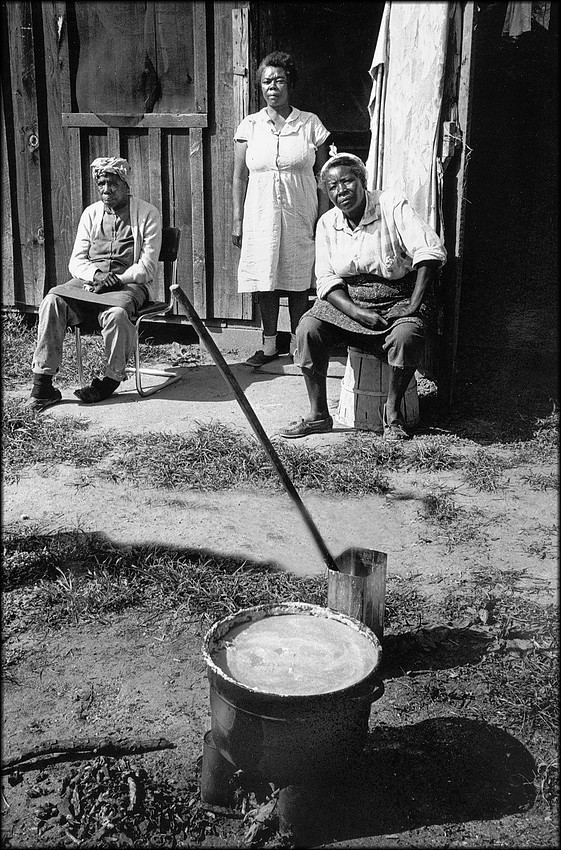

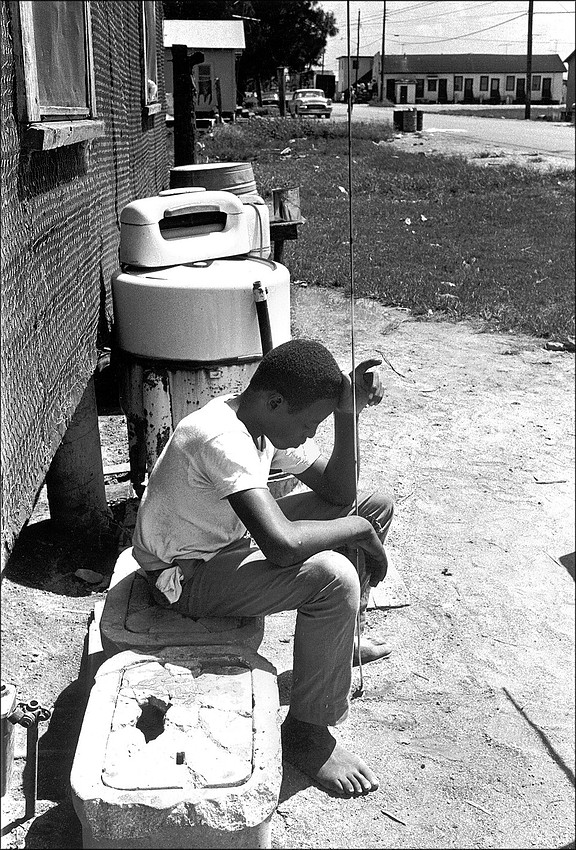

== Career ==
As a newspaper journalist, Dallas has also worked for the Washington Evening Journal in Washington, Iowa, The Dubuque Telegraph Herald, in Dubuque, Iowa, The Miami Herald in Miami, Florida, and The Philadelphia Inquirer in Philadelphia, Pennsylvania.

Kinney was a student of photographer Ansel Adams in Carmel, California. Kinney has a passion for and continuing desire to create "Ansel Adams-like" photographs as they exist in current times.

In addition to the Pulitzer, Kinney has received the following awards: Robert F. Kennedy Journalism Award, World Press Association/Photojournalism, National Press Photographers Association Regional, Iowa News Photographer of the Year, Florida News Photographer of the Year.

Kinney resides with his wife Martha near the North Georgia mountain town of Dahlonega.
