= Killing of Bernard Whitehurst =

Murder of an American man by a police officer

Bernard Whitehurst, Jr. was shot in the back and killed on December 2, 1975, by Donald Foster, a Montgomery, Alabama police officer who said he thought Whitehurst was the suspect in the robbery of a neighborhood grocery store. In a subsequent cover-up, police officers planted a gun on him. The initial police report said that Whitehurst fired a gun at the officers, and the police returned fire. There was no autopsy and the body was quickly embalmed before the family was contacted; the coroner relied on police reports that Whitehurst was killed by a bullet fired through the chest.

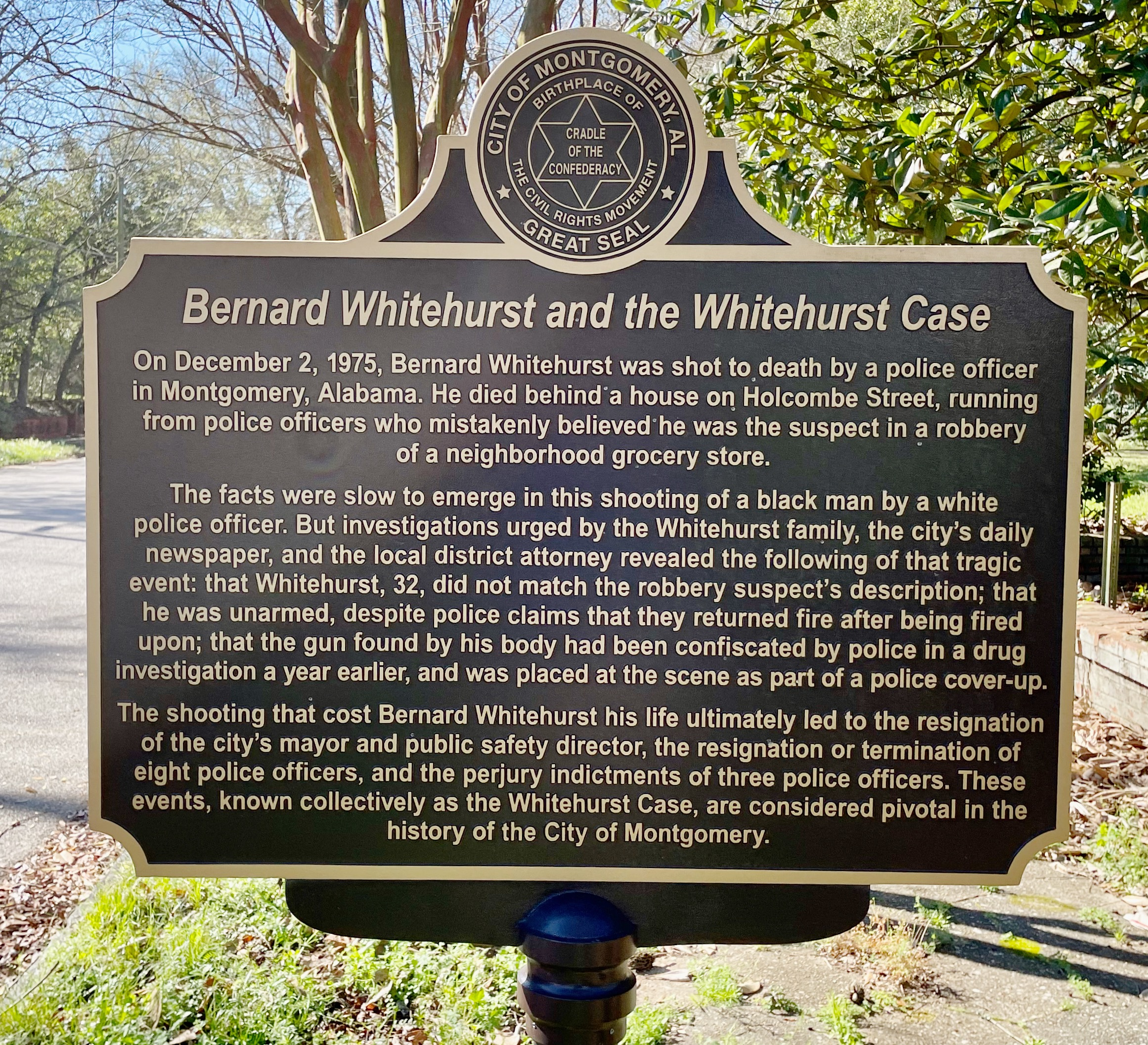
The Whitehurst Case

Six months later, after an investigation by the local newspaper and local attorney Donald Watkins raised questions about the facts of the case, the District Attorney ordered the body to be exhumed and an autopsy performed, which showed that Whitehurst had been shot in the back. A perjury indictment was issued for three police officers.

Eight police officers were forced to resign or were terminated. No police officer was convicted of a crime. The attempted cover-up led to the resignation of the mayor and the Director of Public Safety.

In October 1976, District Judge Robert E. Varner ruled that any conspiracy to violate Whitehurt's civil rights ended with his death. Following the ruling, the jury returned a verdict in favor of former Police Chief Wright, his top aide, Swindall, and Foster.

In 2012, the City of Montgomery acknowledged wrongdoing but no compensation has been given to Whitehurst's family. The Montgomery City Council adopted a resolution that formally expressed regret for the shooting death of Whitehurst. In April 2013, the City of Montgomery placed a historic marker that tells the story of the shooting and the police cover-up in Lister Hill Plaza across from Montgomery City Hall. In June 2015, after the City rejected a request to rename a street for Whitehurst, an agreement was reached for the city to place a second historic marker near the spot where Whitehurst was shot and killed. The second marker was dedicated on the 40th anniversary of his death in December 2015.

== Investigation by the Montgomery Advertiser ==
From the date of the killing, the Montgomery Advertiser covered the shooting of Bernard Whitehurst, Jr. by police and later investigated the subsequent controversy, publishing news stories and editorials that questioned the original police reports. Reporter Bruce Maulden was main reporter who covered the Whitehurst Case, though a variety of other reporters wrote articles about it as well. During the controversy over Whitehurst's death, the police department took issue with some of the newspaper's reporting. To counter claims that his newspaper was fabricating stories, editor and publisher Harold E. Martin took and passed a polygraph.

== Resignations instead of prosecution ==
=== Law enforcement resignations ===
In 1976, three Montgomery police detectives faced perjury charges related to the gun found next to Whitehurst's body, though the only trial resulted in a mistrial. In an attempt to resolve the case, Alabama Attorney General William Baxley agreed that the police involved in the alleged cover-up would not be prosecuted if they passed a polygraph test. Under the agreement, officers who refused to take the test or who failed would be terminated from their jobs. The perjury case against the three officers was dismissed after they resigned instead of taking the polygraph. Eventually, eight police officers were forced to resign or were terminated. No police officer was convicted of a crime. The city’s mayor, James Robinson, and the Director of Public Safety, Ed Wright, also resigned.

== Lawsuit ==
Acting as the administrator of Whitehurst's estate, his mother Ida Mae Whitehurst filed a federal lawsuit claiming that the fatal shooting and police cover-up deprived Whitehurst of rights guaranteed by the fifth, sixth, thirteenth and fourteenth amendments to the United States Constitution. In October 1976, District Judge Robert E. Varner ruled that any conspiracy to violate Whitehurst's civil rights ended with his death. Following the ruling, the jury returned a verdict in favor of former Police Chief Wright, his top aide Charles Swindall, and Donald Foster.

== Legacy ==
A study of the killing, Closed Ranks by Foster Dickson, was published in November 2018 by NewSouth Books.

== See also ==
- List of unarmed African Americans killed by law enforcement officers in the United States
- Shooting of Greg Gunn by Montgomery police officers
