= Montgomery Advertiser =

Daily newspaper in Montgomery, Alabama

- Front page of the Montgomery Advertiser, July 19, 2009
- Type: Daily newspaper
- Format: Broadsheet
- Owner: USA Today Co.
- President: Michael Galvin
- Editor: Paige O. Windsor
- Founded: 1829 (as The Planter's Gazette)
- Language: English
- Headquarters: 425 Molton St. Montgomery, Alabama, 36104
- Circulation: 8,735 (daily); 11,792 (Sunday)
- ISSN: 2993-9151
- OCLC number: 1393208361
- Website: montgomeryadvertiser.com

The Montgomery Advertiser is a daily newspaper and news website located in Montgomery, Alabama. It was founded in 1829.

== History ==
The newspaper began publication in 1829 as The Planter's Gazette. Its first editor was Moseley Baker. It became the Montgomery Advertiser in 1833.

In 1903, Richard F. Hudson Sr., a young Alabama newspaperman, joined the staff of the Advertiser and rose through the ranks of the newspaper. Hudson was central to improving the financial situation of the newspaper, and by 1924 he owned 10% of its stock. Hudson purchased the remaining shares of the company in 1935, and five years later he bought the Alabama Journal, a competitor founded in Montgomery in 1889. Ownership of the Advertiser subsequently passed from Hudson's heirs to Carmage Walls (1963), through Multimedia Corp. (1968) to Gannett (1995).

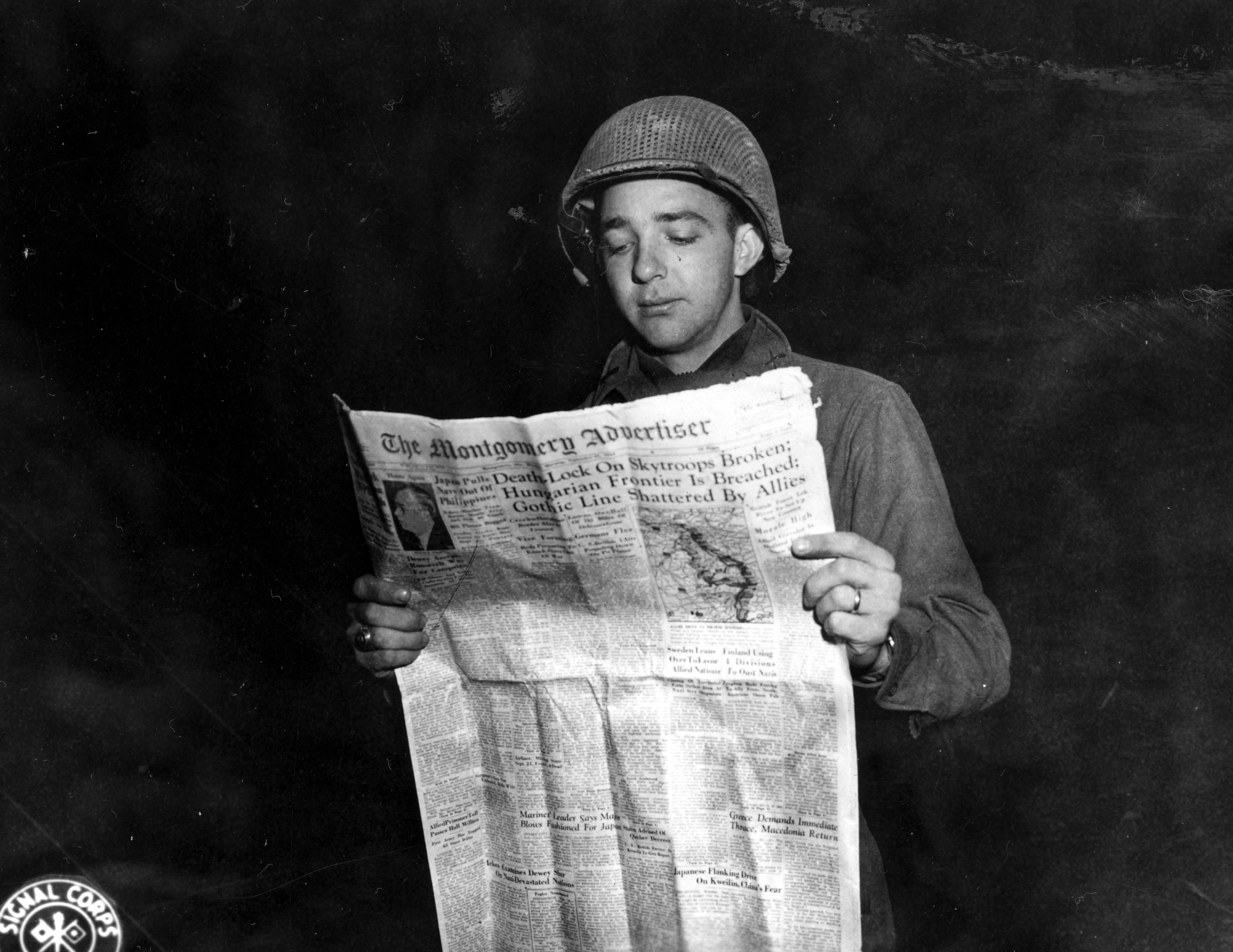
A U.S. soldier reading The Montgomery Advertiser in Italy, January, 1945

Grover C. Hall, Jr. (1915–1971) worked at the paper from age 20 and served 15 years as editor after World War II. He allied with the politician George C. Wallace in 1958. In 1975, the newspaper investigated the shooting of Bernard Whitehurt by police and wrote news stories that questioned the original police reports.^{[5]} To counter claims that newspaper was fabricating stories, publisher Harold E. Martin took and passed a polygraph.^{[5]}

The Alabama Journal continued as a local afternoon paper until April 16, 1993, when it published its last issue before merging with the morning Advertiser. The Advertiser remains one of the most widely read daily newspapers in the state.

=== Civil rights and race relations ===
While the Advertiser opposed secession in 1861, after the Civil War it aligned itself with the cause of white supremacy.

According to a 2018 review by the Advertiser itself, from 1883 to the early 1900s the paper covered the region's frequent lynchings ambivalently. While it nominally condemned the mob murders of black people, its coverage assumed that the victims were guilty of crimes, such as a 1919 editorial that held that "as long as there are attempts at rape by black men, red men or yellow men on white women there will be lynchings". Consequently, the paper's proposals on how to address lynchings focused on how the accused could more efficiently be legally executed instead. It also tended to be more concerned about how lynchings might be treated by Northern papers than about the crimes themselves. In an editorial published on the occasion of the 2018 opening of the National Memorial for Peace and Justice, the editorial board recognized the paper's "own shameful place in the history of these dastardly, murderous deeds", acknowledging that the paper's "careless" coverage of lynchings was "wrong".

The newspaper won the first of its three Pulitzer Prize awards under the direction of Grover C. Hall (1888–1941), who came to the Advertiser in 1910 and served as editor from 1926 until his death. The Advertiser waged war on the Ku Klux Klan during the 1920s, and became nationally prominent for its coverage and editorial stance. Hall later argued for release of the black Scottsboro Boys. Nonetheless, by the 1950s, the paper's coverage of the civil rights movement was "indifferent and antagonistic", often criticizing civil rights activists and their goals.

In 2004, Wanda Lloyd became the Advertiser's first black executive editor.

In June 2025, the paper announced it will switch from carrier to postal delivery.

== Awards ==
The newspaper has earned numerous state, regional and national awards, including three Pulitzer Prizes:

- 1928: Grover C. Hall, Editorial Writing, for "his editorials against gangsterism, floggings and racial and religious intolerance."
- 1970: Harold E. Martin, Investigative Reporting, for "his expose of a commercial scheme for using Alabama prisoners for drug experimentation and obtaining blood plasma from them."
- 1988: Staff of The Alabama Journal, General News Reporting, for "its compelling investigation of the state's unusually high infant-mortality rate, which prompted legislation to combat the problem."

In 1995, the Montgomery Advertiser was recognized by the Pulitzer Prize for work that probed management self-interest, questionable practices, and employee racial discrimination allegations in the SPLC.

== See also ==
- List of newspapers in Alabama
