= Alabama Law Enforcement Agency =

Law enforcement government agency in Alabama, United States

- Alabama Law Enforcement Agency Seal
- Abbreviation: ALEA

Agency overview
- Formed: January 1, 2015
- Preceding agency: 12 legacy agencies

Jurisdictional structure
- Operations jurisdiction: Alabama, US
- General nature: Civilian police

Operational structure
- Headquarters: Montgomery, Alabama
- Agency executive: Hal Taylor, Secretary of Law Enforcement
- Child agencies: State Bureau of Investigation; Alabama Department of Public Safety

Website
- Official website

The Alabama Law Enforcement Agency (ALEA) is a law enforcement agency serving the U.S. state of Alabama. It exists within the Executive Branch of State Government to coordinate public safety in Alabama. It was formed on 1 January 2015 by the merger of 12 state law enforcement agencies. The Secretary, its chief executive, is appointed by and serves at the pleasure of the Governor of Alabama. ALEA is divided into two functional divisions, the Department of Public Safety and the State Bureau of Investigations. The Secretary of ALEA is responsible for appointing a Director of both divisions, after consultation with the Governor.

== History ==
=== Creation ===
The creation of ALEA was proposed by Senator Del Marsh and others in Senate Bill 108 (SB108) during the 2013 regular session of the Alabama Legislature. The bill passed both houses and was signed by then Governor Robert Bentley on 19 March 2013 as Act 2013-67 and codified in the Code of Alabama 1975, Title 41 - State Government, Chapter 27 - Alabama State Law Enforcement Agency.

According to Senator Marsh, the intent of SB108 was to operate public safety "...in a more efficient, cost-effective way.” This bill and its proposed consolidation of preexisting state-level law enforcement agencies (Legacy Agencies) was based on recommendations of a Public Safety Study Group created in 2012 to streamline the state's 22 agencies with law enforcement functions and cut spending.

ALEA combined aspects of enforcement responsibilities for twelve formerly distinct enforcement units within Alabama state government. These include:

1. Alabama Department of Public Safety
2. Alabama Bureau of Investigation
3. Alabama Department of Homeland Security
4. Alabama Fusion Center
5. Alabama Criminal Justice Information Center
6. Marine Police (formerly of the Alabama Department of Conservation)
7. Alcoholic Beverage Control Board Enforcement Division
8. Alabama Department of Revenue Enforcement Division
9. Alabama Forestry Commission Investigations Unit
10. Alabama Agriculture and Industry Investigations Unit
11. Public Service Commission Enforcement Unit
12. Office of Prosecution Services' Computer Forensic Laboratories

=== List of ALEA Secretaries ===
- Hal Taylor
  - 12 April 2017 - Present
- Stan Stabler
  - 17 February 2016 - 12 April 2017
- Spencer Collier
  - 5 April 2013 - 22 March 2016

== See also ==
- List of law enforcement agencies in Alabama
- State police
- Highway patrol
