= Alabama Department of Public Safety =

American law enforcement agency in Alabama

- Alabama Department of Public Safety Seal
- Common name: Alabama State Troopers
- Motto: Courtesy, Service, Protection

Agency overview
- Formed: December 5, 1935
- Preceding agency: Alabama Highway Patrol (1935-1939)
- Employees: 700–1,000 (civilian) ~ 220 (law enforcement)

Jurisdictional structure
- Operations jurisdiction: Alabama, USA
- Legal jurisdiction: State of Alabama
- General nature: Civilian police

Operational structure
- Headquarters: Alabama Criminal Justice Center; Montgomery, Alabama
- Agency executives: Jon Archer, Colonel; Major Will Wright, Director of Highway Patrol; Pamela Shepard, Director of Drivers' License Division; Captain Drew Brooks, Director of Marine Patrol
- Parent agency: Alabama Law Enforcement Agency
- Child agencies: Alabama Highway Patrol; Alabama Marine Patrol; Alabama Drivers License Division

Facilities
- Posts and Field Offices: 15 posts and 2 field offices
- Police Vehicles: Ford Explorer Ford Taurus Ford Expedition Ford Crown Victoria Ford F-150 Ford F-250 Chevrolet Tahoe Chevrolet Suburban Chevrolet Impala Chevrolet Camaro Dodge Charger Dodge Challenger Dodge Durango Dodge Ram
- Helicopters: UH-1-H Huey Bell 206B Jet Ranger OH-58A+(w/ NightSun and FLIR)
- Planes: Beech King Air 200 Cessna C-182
- Dogs: German Shepherd Belgian Malinois

Website
- Official website

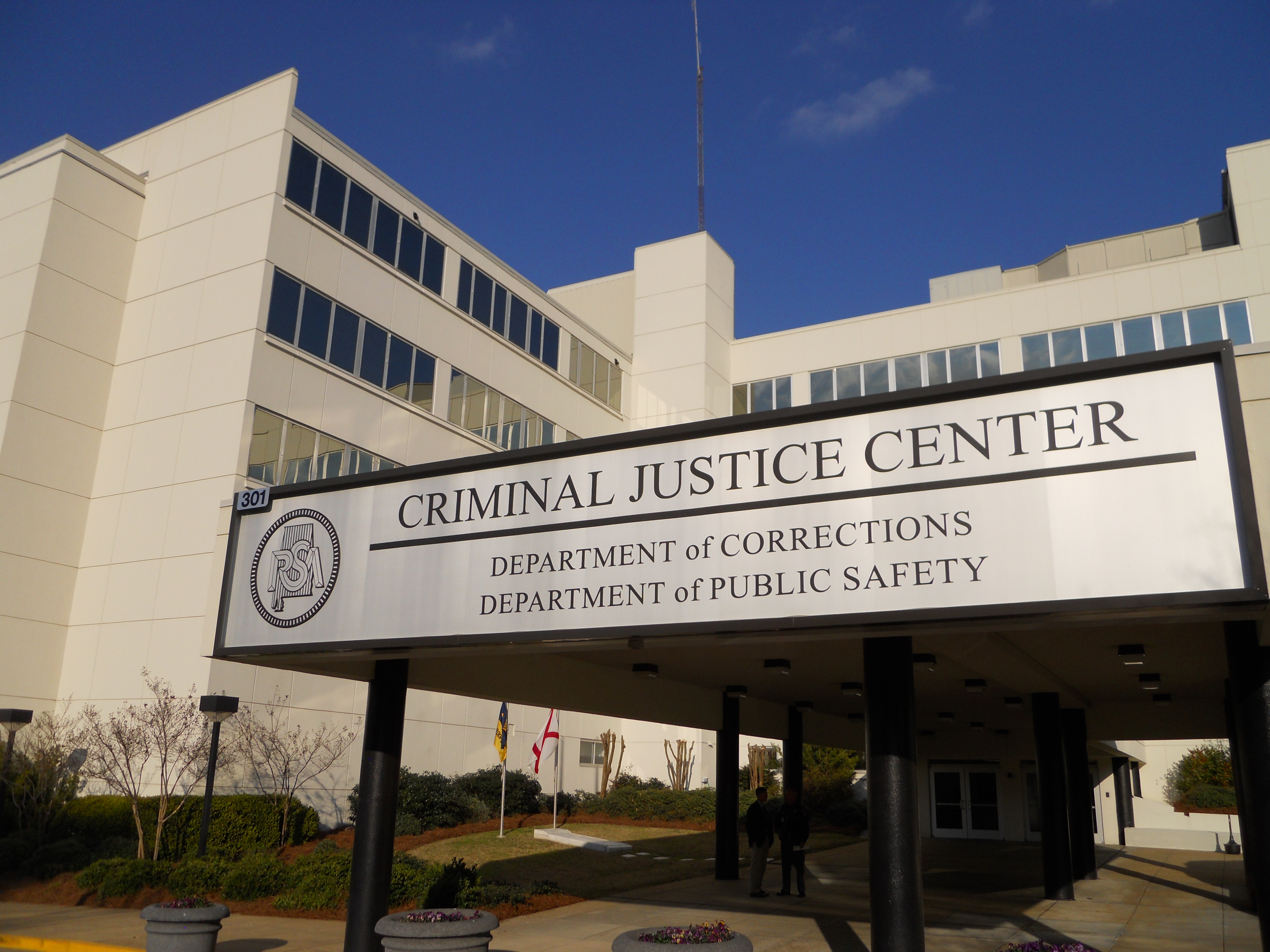
The Alabama Criminal Justice Information Center, which houses the headquarters of the Alabama Department of Public Safety and the Department of Corrections

The Alabama Department of Public Safety is the uniform section of the Alabama Law Enforcement Agency, serving the U.S. state of Alabama. It is made up of three divisions: Highway Patrol Division, Marine Patrol Division, and Drivers' License Division.

== History ==
The Alabama Department of Public Safety began as the Alabama Highway Patrol on December 5, 1935. The Highway Patrol was renamed the Department of Public Safety on March 8, 1939, and then included 4 divisions: Highway Patrol, Driver License, Accident Prevention Bureau, and Mechanical and Equipment.

On January 17, 2011, Hugh B. McCall was appointed to the position of Colonel of the Alabama Department of Public Safety by Governor Robert J. Bentley, making him the first African-American to head the agency. In 2013 the state's law enforcement agencies were streamlined into the Alabama Law Enforcement Agency.

== Organization ==
The Department of Public Safety is headed by a director appointed by the Governor of Alabama who is the executive officer of the department and holds the rank of colonel. The director is aided in managing the department by an assistant director, who is also appointed by the governor and who holds the rank of lieutenant colonel. Each of the department's three divisions are headed by uniformed officers with the rank of major.

- Driver License Division
  - Drive License Examining Unit
  - Drive Records Unit
  - License Reinstatement Unit
  - Safety Responsibility Unit
- Alabama Highway Patrol Division
  - Career Development and Training Office
  - Motor Carrier Safety Unit
  - Traffic Homicide Investigations Office
  - Division Programs Office
  - Patrol Operations
    - Alexander City Post
    - Birmingham Post
    - Decatur Post
    - Dothan Post
    - Eufaula Field Office
    - Evergreen Post
    - Gadsden Post
    - Grove Hill Field Office
    - Hamilton Post
    - Huntsville Post
    - Jacksonville Post
    - Mobile Post
    - Montgomery Post
    - Opelika Post
    - Quad Cities Post
    - Selma Post
    - Troy Post
    - Tuscaloosa Post

–

== Highway Patrol ==
The Alabama Highway Patrol is a division of the Alabama Department of Public Safety and is the highway patrol agency for Alabama, which has jurisdiction anywhere in the state. It was created to protect the lives, property and constitutional rights of people in Alabama.

In 1971, the Alabama Highway Patrol became the first U.S. police organization to use downsized vehicles for regular highway patrol duties when they purchased 132 AMC Javelins. This pre-dated, among others, the Camaros and Mustangs used by other departments years later.

== Marine Patrol ==
The Alabama Marine Patrol Division is responsible for law enforcement on the waterways of Alabama. The mission of the Division is to "enhance safety and promote responsible use of resources on Alabama's waterways through enforcement, education, and community activities". The Division patrols the waterways of the state, oversees pleasure boats registration and boat operators licensing, and provides education to boaters, and also maintains 1,518 waterway markings (buoys).

The Division operates from three districts: Northern, which includes the Tennessee, Coosa, and Black Warrior Rivers; Central, which includes the Coosa, Tallapoosa, Alabama, Tombigbee, and Chattahoochee Rivers; and Southern, which includes the Alabama and Tombigbee Rivers, Mobile Bay, Gulf of Mexico, and other rivers and lakes.

== Rank structure ==
The Alabama Department of Public Safety rank structure is as listed:

Rank	Insignia
Director (If Highway Patrol, Colonel)	
Assistant Director (If Highway Patrol, Lieutenant Colonel)	
Chief (Equivalent to major, is not named major though)	
Captain	
Lieutenant	
Sergeant	
Corporal	
Senior Trooper	
Trooper	

== Fallen officers ==
There have been 29 Alabama State Troopers killed in the line of duty since its beginning in 1935.
