= The Palm Beach Post =

Daily newspaper in West Palm Beach, Florida

- Type: Daily newspaper
- Format: Broadsheet
- Owner: USA Today Co.
- Founded: 1916
- Headquarters: 2751 South Dixie Highway; West Palm Beach, Florida 33405; United States
- Circulation: 17,400 Average print circulation 4,867 Digital Subscribers
- ISSN: 1528-5758
- Website: www.palmbeachpost.com

The Palm Beach Post is an American daily newspaper serving Palm Beach County in South Florida, and parts of the Treasure Coast.

On March 18, 2018, in a deal worth US$42.35 million, The Palm Beach Post and the Palm Beach Daily News were purchased by New York–based New Media Investment Group Inc., which has ever since owned and operated The Palm Beach Post and all circulations and associated digital media sources.

== History ==
The Palm Beach Post began as The Palm Beach County, a weekly newspaper established in 1910. On January 5, 1916, the weekly became a daily, morning publication known as The Palm Beach Post.

In 1934, the Palm Beach businessman Edward R. Bradley bought The Palm Beach Post and The Palm Beach Times, which published daily in the afternoon. In 1947, both were purchased by the longtime resident John Holliday Perry Sr., who owned a Florida newspaper chain of six dailies and 15 weeklies. In 1948, Perry purchased both the Palm Beach Daily News, the main newspaper for the island of Palm Beach, and the society magazine Palm Beach Life.

In June 1969, Cox Enterprises, based in Atlanta, purchased Perry's Palm Beach and West Palm Beach publications and formed Palm Beach Newspapers, Inc. Cox was founded by James M. Cox, a former Ohio governor and the 1920 Democratic presidential candidate who built a media company that today includes daily newspapers; weekly newspapers, radio and television stations; U.S. cable TV systems, local Internet media sites; and Mannheim auto auction locations.

In 1979, The Palm Beach Times was renamed The Evening Times. In 1987, The Evening Times and The Post merged into a single morning newspaper called The Palm Beach Post. In 1989, all assets and archives of the neighboring sister publication Miami News assets and archives were merged with The Palm Beach Post upon the closure of the former newspaper on New Year's Eve in 1988.

In 1996, The Palm Beach Post sponsored the Scripps National Spelling Bee winner Wendy Guey.

The Palm Beach Post photographer Dallas Kinney won the 1970 Pulitzer Prize for Feature Photography for his portfolio of pictures of Florida migrant workers, Migration to Misery. The Post has since had three photographers selected as Pulitzer finalists.

The paper became nationally recognized for its coverage of the 2000 presidential election for reporting about flawed ballots occurring in Palm Beach County.

In 2003, The Palm Beach Post won an American Society of Newspaper Editors (ASNE) prize for their coverage on a local bishop's resignation following confirmed sexual abuse allegations.

Editor Edward Sears won the Editor of the Year award in 2004 from Editor & Publisher. Sears led the newsroom of The Post from 1985 to 2005.

On Oct. 31, 2017, Cox Media Group announced its plans to sell The Palm Beach Post and Palm Beach Daily News. In 2018, it was announced that GateHouse Media would buy the newspapers for US$49.25 million, with the deal closing on May 1. As part of the Gannett and GateHouse Media merger of 2019, nine staffers were laid off from The Palm Beach Post in 2020.

== Recent operations ==
In March 1996, PalmBeachPost.com was launched.

In June 2008, the leaders of The Post decided to focus on the core readership area of Palm Beach County and southern Martin County. Faced with economic downturn and a changing industry, The Post reduced its payroll of 1,350 to about 1,000 and closed bureaus in Stuart, Port St. Lucie and Delray Beach.

In December 2008, The Post closed its presses and moved printing to the Deerfield Beach plant of the Fort Lauderdale Sun-Sentinel.

On March 18, 2018, The Palm Beach Post was sold to the New York-based New Media Investment Group Inc. in a deal worth US$42.35 million.

In August 2018, The Post digital team launched the GateHouse Florida Digital Audience team to expand GateHouse's digital audience across Florida.

On April 4, 2019, the longtime editor Tim Burke accepted a lucrative position worth hundreds of thousands of dollars with LRP Media Group after the sale of The Palm Beach Post and all subsidies to the New York Conglomerate, New Media Investment Group. LRP is currently registered as a political research group in Florida.

On Dec. 17, 2020, The Post named Rick Christie as its executive editor.

== Staff ==
Holly Baltz, Hannah Phillips, Jane Musgrave and Kristina Webb, are four writers and editors who earned second-place honors in the Class A division for the Frances DeVore Award for Public Service, the Florida Press Club's 2026 Excellence in Journalism competition's top award, for "Jeffrey Epstein: The Grand Jury Papers," a series of reports on the newspaper's litigation to release a 2006 grand jury transcript in the late convicted sex offender's case.

The Society of Professional Journalists Green Eyeshade Excellence in Journalism annual Award, for journalists working in the Southern United States, recognized Holly Baltz, Jane Musgrave, Hannah Phillips; and Kristina Webb.

Holly Maxwell Baltz is the award-winning investigations editor. Baltz has worked, by 2025, for The Palm Beach Post for 34 years, after her first professional journalism job at the Raleigh News & Observer. Baltz has worked as the South Carolina bureau editor at the Charlotte Observer. Baltz has a bachelor's degree in journalism from the University of South Florida.

Hannah Phillips covers civil and criminal court proceedings at The Palm Beach Post since 2022.

== See also ==
- List of newspapers in Florida
