= Philip L. Geyelin =

American journalist

Philip L. Geyelin (1923–2004) was an American journalist and author. Born in Devon, Pennsylvania, he graduated from Yale in 1943. He joined the U.S. Marines and fought at Iwo Jima. In 1946 he joined The Wall Street Journal as a foreign correspondent, serving as the newspaper's bureau chief in Paris and London and later covering the Vietnam War. In 1967 he was hired as deputy editorial page editor by The Washington Post and soon became senior editor. He was awarded the Pulitzer Prize for editorial writing in 1970. By 1979 he was specializing in Middle Eastern issues for the Post.

He is the author of Lyndon B. Johnson and the World, published in 1966.
