= Alabama Alcoholic Beverage Control Board =

Agency of the U.S. state of Alabama

The Alabama Alcoholic Beverage Control Board (ABC Board) is an Alabama state government agency responsible for licensing or permitting participants in the alcoholic beverages industry in Alabama. Alabama is an alcoholic beverage control state, thus the state has a monopoly over the wholesaling or retailing of some or all categories of alcoholic beverages.

The agency was established in 1937. As of 2022, the agency operated 168 stores selling alcohol within the state. Alcohol is distributed from a central warehouse located in Montgomery, Alabama.
