= Alabama Journal =

Defunct newspaper; 1889–1993

- Type: Daily newspaper (Weekdays with a weekend edition)
- Format: Broadsheet
- Founded: 1889
- Ceased publication: April 16, 1993
- Language: English
- Headquarters: Montgomery, Alabama
- Country: United States
- ISSN: 0745-323X
- OCLC number: 2666111

Alabama Journal, formerly the Evening Journal, Montgomery Journal, and Alabama Journal and the Times, was a newspaper in Montgomery, Alabama founded in 1889. It ceased publication in 1993.

== History ==
There was an Alabama Journal published from 1825 to 1850. George Washington Bonaparte Towns owned and edited it.

The Evening Journal was established in 1889 and became the Montgomery Journal in 1891. It was renamed the Alabama Journal and the Times in 1927. In September 1940 the name was shortened to the Alabama Journal.

It competed with the Montgomery Advertiser and was purchased by that paper's publisher, Richard F. Hudson, in 1940.

It was a daily newspaper.

In 1988 the paper was a Pulitzer Prize finalist in the General Reporting category for its coverage of infant mortality rates that resulted in legislation. Jim Earhardt and Jim Tharpe wrote for the paper.

For a time it was published as part of the combined Montgomery Advertiser & Alabama Journal.
