= Harold E. Martin =

American newspaper publisher and editor

Harold Eugene Martin (October 4, 1923 – July 4, 2007) was a Pulitzer Prize-winning newspaper editor and publisher who was also a director of the Billy Graham Evangelistic Association. During his career, Martin lived in the U.S. states of Alabama, New York, Missouri, Arkansas, Tennessee and Texas.
