= List of cases of police brutality by date =

This list compiles incidents alleged or proved to be due to police brutality that attracted significant media or historical attention. Many cases are alleged to be of brutality; some cases are more than allegations, with official reports concluding that a crime was committed by police, with some criminal convictions for offences such as grievous bodily harm, planting evidence and wrongful arrest.

== Before 1990 ==
- 21 September 1920: Sack of Balbriggan –- Royal Irish Constabulary (RIC) special constables known as "Black and Tans" burned and looted numerous houses and pubs in Balbriggan, Ireland. They also beat two local men to death. This was a reprisal for the Irish Republican Army (IRA) assassination of two RIC officers in the town.
- 22 September 1920: In reprisal for an IRA ambush, the Black and Tans killed five civilians and burnt 16 houses and shops in west County Clare, Ireland.
- 1–9 November 1920: In revenge for the IRA's killing of two local RIC policemen, the Black and Tans "besieged" the town of Tralee, Ireland. They imposed a curfew, fired on civilians in the streets, let no food in for a week and shot dead eight people in the town and surrounding area, many of them civilians.
- 21 November 1920: The Croke Park massacre in Dublin, Ireland. The Auxiliary Division opened fire on civilians who were watching a Gaelic football match in Croke Park; 49 were killed and 60–70 wounded. The attack was believed to be revenge for an IRA assassination operation earlier in the day.
- 24 March 1922: The McMahon killings in Belfast, Northern Ireland. Officers of the Ulster Special Constabulary (USC) broke into a house owned by an Irish Catholic family and shot all eight males inside. Six were killed. It is believed to have been a reprisal for the IRA's killing of two policemen the day before.
- 1 April 1922: The Arnon Street killings in Belfast, Northern Ireland. Ulster Special Constables broke into several Irish Catholic homes, shooting and beating six Catholics to death, including a child. This was believed to have been a reprisal for the IRA's killing of a policeman in the area.
- 19 May 1922: In revenge for the burning of a Protestant-owned mill, a mob of Ulster Special Constables and loyalists attacked and burned many Catholic homes and businesses in Desertmartin, Northern Ireland. Special Constables took four Catholic men from their homes nearby, lined them up by the roadside and summarily executed them.
- 23 June 1922: A group of Ulster Special Constables opened fire on civilians in the village of Cushendall, Northern Ireland, while preparing to enforce a nightly curfew. Special Constables summarily executed three young Catholic men by shooting them at close range. They claimed they were ambushed by the IRA and returned fire, but a British government inquiry concluded that this was not true. The report was not made public for almost a century.
- 25 December 1951: Five Hispanic men and two white men were severely beaten by members of the Los Angeles Police Department, in an incident known as the Bloody Christmas. Eight officers were indicted for assault, and five were found guilty.
- 21 March 1960. South African police shot at a crowd of black anti-apartheid protesters, killing 69 and injuring over 180 in what became known as the Sharpeville massacre. Evidence showed that the police continued firing even when the crowd had turned to run, and the majority of those killed and wounded were shot in the back. The Truth and Reconciliation Commission later concluded that the police actions had constituted "gross human rights violations in that excessive force was unnecessarily used to stop a gathering of unarmed people." (see Sharpeville massacre article for sourcing).
- 17 October 1961. The French police attacked a large demonstration of unarmed and peaceful protesters of Algerian origin, killing between 70 and 200 (numbers are uncertain, partly because many were drowned after being thrown into the Seine with their hands tied), in the Paris massacre of 1961.
- 7 March 1965. Alabama Highway Patrol troopers attacked civil rights demonstrators at the Edmund Pettus Bridge between Selma and Montgomery in an event that came to be known as "Bloody Sunday".
- 19 April 1969 in Derry, Northern Ireland. During rioting between Irish nationalists and the Royal Ulster Constabulary (RUC), officers broke into the home of Catholic civilian Samuel Devenny (42), who was not involved in the riots. The officers beat Devenny ferociously with batons. His young daughter (who was recovering from surgery) and a family friend were beaten unconscious. His older daughter and son were also attacked. It is believed the attack led to Devenny's death on 17 July 1969.
- 13 July 1969: Catholic civilian Francis McCloskey (67) was beaten with batons by Royal Ulster Constabulary (RUC) officers during street disturbances in Dungiven, Northern Ireland, and died of his injuries the following day. He is sometimes deemed to be the first death of "The Troubles".
- 14–15 August 1969: During the 1969 Northern Ireland riots, the Royal Ulster Constabulary (RUC) shot dead five Catholic civilians and opened fire on crowds of Irish nationalist protesters. A nine-year-old boy was killed when police fired on a block of flats with Browning machine guns.
- 1967–74: the methods of the Greek military junta were documented in the docudrama Your Neighbor's Son. It focused on the brutalization of young Military Police recruits which turned them into torturers. Michalis Petrou, a conscript who became a notorious torturer, testified against his former colleagues.
- May 4, 1970. Kent State, Ohio, United States of America. 4 students were killed and 9 wounded during an antiwar protest. They were shot by the National Guard.
- May 15, 1970. Jackson State, United States of America. 2 are killed and tens injured when Highway Patrol shot into a crowd at the Historically Black University.
- 11 May 1972: Dr George Ian Ogilvie Duncan was killed after allegedly being thrown into River Torrens by a group of police officers who were conducting routine “gay-bashing” in “beats”. The police officers suspected to be involved did not cooperate during an inquest, and they were later suspended or resigned from South Australia Police. In 1985, the case was reopened, and the police officers involved were charged with manslaughter, but none were successfully prosecuted due to a lack of evidence. This case of police brutality pioneered the decriminalisation of homosexuality in Australia.
- 1977. Steve Biko is widely believed to have been killed by police as a result of anti-apartheid demonstrations in South Africa.
- 1981: three people were killed by plastic bullets fired by the Royal Ulster Constabulary (RUC) in Northern Ireland during the 1981 Irish hunger strike protests, and many others were badly injured.
- 6 December 1986: Malik Oussekine was beaten to death by police after being suspected of participating in a student protest in Paris, triggering widespread outrage.

== 1990–1999 ==
- 2 March 1991: Rodney King was beaten with batons and kicked by four Los Angeles Police Department officers. The four officers were charged with assault with a deadly weapon, and found not guilty, prompting riots in Los Angeles. The four officers were tried again in a federal court, and two of the officers were found guilty of violating King's civil rights.
- 29 August 1993: The Vigário Geral massacre occurred when 33 Brazilian law enforcement officers, including 28 military officers, sought revenge against drug traffickers for the killing of four police officers two days prior to the massacre. The officers opened fire on local residents in a community north of Rio de Janeiro, killing 21 people. Six officers were convicted of the murders.
- 22 December 1994: Anthony Baez was fatally choked by New York Police Department officer Francis Livoti in the Bronx, following an altercation with him. In June 1998, Livoti was convicted in a federal court on charges of violating Baez's civil rights, and was sentenced to seven and a half years imprisonment.
- 24 August 1995: Three officers from the Bangladesh Police - Moinul Hoque, Abdus Sattar, and Amrita Lal - abducted, raped, and murdered 14-year-old Yasmin Akhter in Dinajpur. The killing, and a subsequent attempted police coverup, provoked widespread outrage and riots that resulted in seven deaths after police fired on demonstrators. The three officers were convicted of murder and executed in 2004; however, other officers charged in connection with the coverup and violence during the unrest were all acquitted.
- July 1996: During the Drumcree protests and riots in Northern Ireland, the Royal Ulster Constabulary (RUC) fired 6,000 plastic bullets over several days. The Committee on the Administration of Justice (CAJ) condemned what it called the "completely indiscriminate" use of plastic bullets, while Human Rights Watch accused the police of using "excessive force". The two largest Irish nationalist political parties said they had lost faith in the RUC as an impartial police force.
- 3 January 1998: Six policemen from the North East Rand Dog Unit set their dogs on three suspected illegal immigrants, allowing the animals to attack the three men as the officers shouted racial insults. The incident was caught on video and televised nationally by the South African Broadcasting Corporation on 7 November 2000, causing widespread outrage. All six policemen were ultimately sentenced to jail terms of between four and five years each.
- 4 February 1999: In the early hours of 4 February 1999, a 23-year-old Guinean immigrant named Amadou Diallo was fatally shot by four New York City Police Department plainclothes officers. One of them later claimed to have mistaken him for a rape suspect from one year earlier. The four officers, who were part of the now-defunct Street Crimes Unit, were charged with second-degree murder and acquitted at trial in Albany, New York.

== 2000–2009 ==
- 2000: Officers from the Philadelphia Police Department attacked Thomas Jones while he was wounded.
- 9 May 2001: Police fired tear gas and plastic bullets into crowds at the Accra Sports Stadium, Ghana, causing a stampede in which 127 people died. It was Africa's worst sporting disaster. An official inquiry blamed police over-reaction, but prosecution failed to establish a case.
- 20–21 July 2001: Carlo Giuliani, protesting at the 27th G8 summit was shot dead by police in Genoa, Italy; the officer was tried, but acquitted on the grounds that he had acted in self-defence. 62 other protesters were hospitalized (including three comatose) after a brutal night-time raid on the Diaz school where they were sleeping. In a trial that concluded in 2010, 25 Italian police officers were convicted of grievous bodily harm, planting evidence and wrongful arrest.
- 23 May 2003: Ousmane Zongo, a Burkina Faso national, was unarmed as he was shot four times by a New York Police Department officer during a raid at a warehouse. Bryan Conroy was convicted of criminally negligent homicide and was sentenced to five years probation.
- 4 September 2005: Danziger Bridge shootings. Two unarmed civilians were killed and four others were wounded by New Orleans, Louisiana police officers. Five officers were found guilty in the deaths, and received sentencings ranging from 6 to 65 years of prison.
- 25 September 2005: 18-year-old Italian student Federico Aldrovandi was killed after being beaten up during an arrest in Ferrara. The four officers involved in the incident, Monica Segatto, Luca Pollastri, Enzo Pontani and Paolo Forlani were found guilty of manslaughter due to excessive force and faced 6 months in prison, after the initial sentence of three years and six months was reduced due to a controversial pardon issued in 2006 by the Italian Parliament.
- 3 May 2006: In San Salvador Atenco, Mexico, a group of police officers prevented a group of 60 flower vendors from selling at a market, and used violence against the resisters. The confrontations lead to a civil unrest in the town, leaving two protesters dead and dozens of people, mostly women, were sexually assaulted by officers. The officers involved were charged by the National Human Rights Commission with using excessive force.
- 7 March 2006: Unarmed Joseph Erin Hamley was fatally shot by an Arkansas State Police trooper. The trooper was convicted of negligent homicide.
- 7 September 2006: Eugene Ejike Obiora, a Nigerian-Norwegian student, was killed during an arrest where Obiora had behaved aggressively toward personnel at the social services office in Trondheim. Obiora died en route to a hospital after a police officer held him in a stranglehold. The case made headlines and three officers were accused of racism and excessive use of force, but they were cleared by police investigators and the chief prosecutor.
- 21 November 2006: Kathryn Johnston was fatally shot in her house by three Atlanta, Georgia undercover police officers, during a drug raid. One of the officers planted marijuana in her house. Three officers were convicted of manslaughter and were sentenced to five to ten years imprisonment.
- 25 November 2006: Sean Bell was fatally shot in Queens by New York City police (NYPD). A total of 50 rounds were fired by the three undercover police officer. Bell was killed on the morning before his wedding, and two of his friends, Trent Benefield and Joseph Guzman, were severely wounded. The incident sparked fierce criticism of the New York City Police Department from members of the public and drew comparisons to the 1999 killing of Amadou Diallo.
- 7 January 2008: Wei Wenhua was beaten to death by police officers in Hubei province, China.
- 6 December 2008: 15-year-old Alexandros Grigoropoulos was fatally shot by police officer Epaminondas Korkoneas in Athens, Greece. Demonstrations and riots erupted throughout Athens almost immediately after the shooting, sparking weeks of civil unrest and workplace and university occupations throughout Greece and beyond.
- 1 January 2009: Oscar Grant was fatally shot by BART Police officer Johannes Mehserle in Oakland, California, U.S. Grant was unarmed and laying on his stomach as he was shot. Mehserle was found guilty of involuntary manslaughter and was sentenced to two years of prison, and served 11 months.

== 2010–2019 ==
- 6 June 2010: Khaled Mohamed Saeed, 28, was beaten to death by two Egyptian policemen in Alexandria, while he was in police custody. The officers were found guilty of manslaughter.
- 31 July 2010: Michael Burris, 27, death was ruled a homicide caused by positional asphyxia due to police misconduct and medical negligence in Millville, New Jersey. After collapsing on his deck, Burris regained consciousness but was allegedly met with excessive force by EMS personnel, who refused to leave the premises despite family requests. Millville Police subsequently handcuffed and shackled Burris face-down on a stretcher. Despite stating he could not breathe, he was forcibly removed from his home and died while being carried to the ambulance. https://www.nj.com/cumberland/2010/12/millville_widow_emts_were_aggr.html
- 30 August 2010: John T. Williams, a deaf woodcarver, was fatally shot by Seattle, Washington police officer Ian Birk. Williams was walking away from Birk with a carving knife in his hand, and was shot four times. Birk was not charged by county prosecutors in Williams' death, and the Seattle Police Department's Firearms Review Board ruled that Birk was unjustified in shooting Williams and violated the department's policy. Birk resigned from the department.
- 5 October 2010: Danny Rodriguez, 29, was shot twice in the chest and killed by Phoenix, Arizona officer Richard Chrisman. Rodriguez was holding a bicycle as he was shot, and police were called to his family's home in response to a domestic dispute. Chrisman was found guilty of manslaughter, assault, and animal cruelty.
- 12 December 2010: Douglas Zerby was shot twelve times and killed by two Long Beach, California police officers. Police were called in response to Zerby holding a garden hose nozzle, which police claimed to have mistaken for a handgun. Zerby's family was awarded $6.5 million after a jury found the Long Beach Police Department to be responsible for Zerby's death.
- 6 June 2011: 22-year-old Martin Neškovski was beaten to death by Igor Spasov, a member of the special police unit Tigers, in the center of Skopje, Republic of Macedonia, during the celebration of the ruling party VMRO-DPMNE's election victory, supposedly because he wanted to climb on stage and congratulate the Prime Minister Nikola Gruevski personally. After an unsuccessful attempt by the Macedonian institutions to cover up the murder, which was followed by two-day demonstrations in Skopje, Spasov admitted the murder. Protests were held daily throughout June and July, demanding greater control over special police unit members and political and moral responsibility.
- 9 July 2011: The United Nations human rights office expressed disappointment on the use of excessive force by the police against peaceful protestors in the Bersih 2.0 rally, which was organised by the Coalition for Clean and Fair Elections (Bersih) calling for electoral reform in Kuala Lumpur, Malaysia.
- February 2012: Patricia Cook was fatally shot while in her SUV by Culpeper, Virginia officer Daniel Harmon-Wright. Harmon-Wright was convicted of voluntary manslaughter.
- 22 July 2012: Alecia Thomas was kicked and punched by Los Angeles Police Department officer Mary O'Callaghan during an arrest, and later died in police custody. O'Callaghan was found guilty of assault, but not guilty of causing her death. She was sentenced to three years imprisonment.
- 16 August 2012: The Marikana Massacre which occurred during the wildcat Marikana miners' strike was the single most lethal use of force by South African security forces against civilians since the Sharpeville massacre during the apartheid era.
- 26 February 2013: Mido Macia was handcuffed to and dragged by a police vehicle for 500 metres (550 yd) in Gauteng, South Africa. Eight officers were convicted of murder.
- 17 July 2013: Deng Zhengjia was beaten to death with a scale during an encounter with multiple City Urban Administrative and Law Enforcement Bureau officers who confronted Deng for selling watermelons in Hunan province, China.
- 29 August 2013: John Geer was fatally shot by officer Adam Torres in Springfield, Virginia, as his arms were raised up and a gun was on the ground away from him. Torres pleaded guilty to involuntary manslaughter.
- 12 February 2014: Bassil Da Costa was fatally shot during an opposition march in Caracas, Venezuela. Six Bolivarian Intelligence Service (SEBIN) officers were apprehended as a result.
- 22 February 2014: During the 2014 Venezuelan protests, a National Guardsman shot student Geraldine Moreno in the face at point blank range with shotgun pellets, who died in the hospital after sustaining wounds.
- 17 July 2014: Eric Garner was tackled and choked to death by NYPD officer Daniel Pantaleo after Pantaleo and his partner suspected Garner was selling sole Cigarettes from the box without a tax stamp. After Garner stepped away from the officers, Pantaleo tackled and choked Garner. On the ground, Garner screamed "I can't breathe" multiple times before he went unconscious and laid on the sidewalk for 7 minutes before an ambulance arrived. Garner was later pronounced dead at a nearby hospital. Garner's death sparked outrage and protest across the nation. In 2015, Garner's family was awarded 5.9 million dollars in a settlement with the City of New York. Daniel Pantaleo was fired from the NYPD and stripped of his pension in 2019, more than 5 years after Garner's death.
- 5 September 2014: Levar Jones was shot and injured by South Carolina State Trooper Sean Groubert after Groubert asked Jones to get out his license. Groubert was fired, and pleaded guilty to assault and battery.
- 14 September 2014: Bryce Masters, 17, was tasered for 23 seconds by Independence, Missouri officer Timothy Runnels, during a traffic stop. Masters suffered from brain injuries as a result. Runnels pleaded guilty to violating Masters' civil rights and was sentenced to four years of prison. Masters sued Runnels, who was denied qualified immunity, and was awarded 6.5 million dollars in December 2018. The judgement was later upheld on appeal.
- 12 October 2014: Jack Jacquez, 27, was shot in the back and killed by officer James Ashby in Rocky Ford, Colorado. Jacquez was in his mother's kitchen and was unarmed as he was shot. Ashby was found guilty of second degree murder.
- 20 November 2014: Akai Gurley was fatally shot by New York City Police Officer Peter Liang, as Liang and another officer were patrolling an unlit stairwell in a housing project. The shooting was considered accidental by Liang and prosecutors, and Liang was convicted of criminally negligent homicide.
- 28 December 2014: Michael Johansen was burglarizing a convenience store, and Baltimore Police Department officers arrived on the scene. Johansen reached into his waistband area, and officers shot and injured him. As Johansen was on the floor, officer Wesley Cagle shot him. Two officers were cleared in the shooting, but Cagle was charged and convicted of assault.
- 22 April 2015: William Chapman II, an 18-year-old shoplifting suspect, was shot in a Wal-Mart parking lot by Portsmouth, Virginia police officer Stephen Rankin. According to witnesses, Chapman had his fists raised in the air, and was standing at least six feet away from Rankin before Rankin fired two shots, striking Chapman in the face and chest. On 4 August 2016, Rankin was found not guilty of first-degree murder, but guilty of voluntary manslaughter.
- 25 November 2015: Andrew Thomas, 26, was driving drunk and crashed his car, killing his wife. Thomas emerged from his car, and Patrick Feaster, a Paradise, California police officer accidentally fired his gun once at Thomas, hitting him in the neck. Thomas died from his injuries in December 2015. In October 2016, Feaster was found guilty of involuntary manslaughter.
- 26 September 2016: Terence Crutcher, 40, was shot and killed by police officer Betty Jo Shelby in Tulsa, Oklahoma. He was unarmed during the encounter, in which he was standing near his vehicle in the middle of a street. Police stated that Crutcher consistently reached into his pocket, refused to show his hands, walked towards his vehicle despite being told to stop, and then "angled towards and reached into his vehicle". The shooting led to protests in Tulsa. On 22 September, the Tulsa County District Attorney charged Shelby with first-degree manslaughter after the shooting was labeled a homicide. On 17 May 2017, a jury found her not guilty of first-degree manslaughter.
- April 9 2017: Dr. David Dao, a pulmonologist, was assaulted by officers of the Chicago Department of Aviation at O'Hare Airport when he declined to vacate his seat on United Express Flight 3411, which was overbooked; Dao stated that he needed to stay on the flight as he had patients to see the following day. In the incident, Dao was violently assaulted to the point of bleeding and suffering a broken nose and fractures to his teeth, then forcibly dragged down the plane's aisle and off the aircraft. During the investigation of the incident by the Office of the Inspector General, it was found that the officers involved had 'improperly escalated' the incident, and that a sergeant had 'made misleading statements and deliberately removed material facts' in their own report of the incident. The two officers involved in the assault were fired, with two others receiving suspensions.
- 26 April 2017: During the 2017 Venezuelan protests, student Juan Pablo Pernalete was killed by the impact of a tear gas canister in his chest fired by the National Guard, arriving at the clinic without vital signs.
- 7 June 2017: During the Venezuelan protests, 17-year-old Neomar Lander is killed after being shot directly with a tear gas canister fired by the Bolivarian National Police. Government sources argue that he died due to a homemade mortar.
- 19 June 2017: During the Venezuelan protests, 17-year-old Fabián Urbina was killed by a National Guardsman who fired live ammunition at protesters, wounding at least four others.
- On 14 December 2018, Amnesty International reported police brutality during the yellow vests movement. France's yellow vests protests began against an increased fuel tax made by President Emmanuel Macron. Participation in the weekly protests diminished due to violence, particularly due to the loss of eyes and hands, and the development of neurological disorders caused by police blast balls. The protests eventually stopped due to the COVID-19 pandemic but continued again after health restrictions lifted.

== From 2020 ==
- 2020, January 1, eye injuries in the 2019–2020 Chilean protests: in two separate incidents two men were permanently blinded in one of their eyes as result of being hit by tear gas grenades shot by Chilean riot police.
- 2020, March 13: Breonna Taylor, 26, was shot and killed in her Louisville, Kentucky apartment after a botched raid happened in her home, killing her as she laid in her bed.
- 2020, May 25: George Floyd, 46, was murdered by Officer Derek Chauvin in Minneapolis, Minnesota. He was prostrate on the ground, lying face down. The video evidence shows him pleading for his life, while Chauvin's knee remains on his neck for the duration of the video. The murder of George Floyd led to protests around the world, and led to many celebrities condemning police brutality. Chauvin was promptly fired by the Minneapolis Police Department and was initially charged with third-degree murder and second-degree manslaughter. The charge of second-degree murder was later added. Chauvin was found guilty of all three charges on 20 April 2021. The other three officers that were near Floyd at the time and did not help Floyd were charged with aiding and abetting the killing.
- 2022, September 16: Mahsa Amini, 22, died in police custody. She had been arrested by Iran's morality police for not wearing a headscarf in accordance with Iranian law. Witnesses stated Amini was beaten by the police. Her death provoked large-scale protests across Iran.
- 2024, May 3: Roger Fortson, 23, was shot and killed in his Fort Walton Beach, Florida apartment by Officer Eddie Duran after going to the wrong apartment to address a domestic violence incident. Fortson later died at the hospital.
- 2024, July 6: Sonya Massey, 36, was shot and killed in her Woodside Township, Illinois home by Sheriff's Deputy Sean Grayson, who believed Massey threatened to throw hot water in his face after telling him, "I rebuke you in the name of Jesus." Grayson was fired and charged with three counts of first-degree murder. Grayson was found guilty of second-degree murder and sentenced to the maximum of 20 years in prison.

== See also ==
- Wandering officer
- Police brutality in the United States
- List of unarmed African Americans killed by law enforcement officers in the United States
