= List of killings by law enforcement officers in the United States, August 2013 =

This is a list of people reported killed by non-military law enforcement officers in the United States in August 2013, whether in the line of duty or not, and regardless of reason or method. The listing documents the occurrence of a death, making no implications regarding wrongdoing or justification on the part of the person killed or officer involved. Killings are arranged by date of the incident that caused death. Different death dates, if known, are noted in the description. The table below lists 54 people.

== August 2013 ==
Date	Name (Age) of Deceased	Race	State (City)	Description
2013-08-31	Vergel Ricafrente Worrell (46)	Hispanic	California (Union City)	A man reportedly fired 10 to 15 gunshots in a neighborhood in Union City. The gunman refused to comply with the officers' demand and was then shot.
2013-08-31	Mathew Jackson (29)	White	Texas (San Antonio)	
2013-08-31	Rickey Rozelle (28)	Black	Illinois (Chicago)	
2013-08-30	Kenneth Thompson (47)	Unknown race	Ohio (Cleveland)	
2013-08-30	William Edward Hall (34)	White	Oregon (Sisters)	
2013-08-30	Jaime Ceballos (32)	Hispanic	Colorado (Thornton)	
2013-08-29	John Geer (46)	White	Virginia (Springfield)	After police responded to a call of a domestic dispute at a house in Springfield, Geer stood unarmed with his hands up, calmly telling police he didn't want anybody including himself to be shot. Without warning, officer Adam D. Torres then shot and killed Geer from 17 feet away claiming he thought he saw Geer move his hands down; four other officers saw no such movement. A wrongful death lawsuit brought by Geer's family resulted in a $2.95 million settlement in April 2015. On August 17, 2015, Torres was charged with second degree murder.
2013-08-29	Scott Leon Holland (42)	White	Texas (Fort Worth)	
2013-08-29	James Daniel Guler (73)	Unknown race	Georgia (Buford)	
2013-08-29	John Allen (34)	Black	Oregon (Dalles)	After being stopped for speeding on I-84, Allen got out of his car and fired at a state trooper who returned fire. Allen got back in his car and drove away but was found dead a few miles down the road. His three children 10, 13, and 15 were in the car at the time of the incident.
2013-08-27	Henry Kiner (27)	Black	Florida (Oakland Park)	
2013-08-27	Korey Marcel Germaine	Black	California (Antioch)	Germaine was shot and killed after pointing a gun at officers during a police chase.
2013-08-24	Edmond Fair (24)		Minnesota (Brooklyn Center)	Fair was shot during a traffic stop. He was unarmed and witnesses say he was in handcuffs at the time of the shooting.
2013-08-23	Angel Toscano (39)		California (Fresno)	Angel Toscano and his brother were pulled over by two Fresno Police officers while riding their bikes about 7:30 p.m. When Angel Toscano fled from the scene one officer pursued him in his car. During the pursuit down an alley the officer's car struck and killed Angel Toscano. In January 2017 the City of Fresno settled the family's lawsuit, agreeing to pay $675,000.
2013-08-20	Tony Procell (24)		Louisiana (Many)	Procell was allegedly kidnapped and beaten to death by Robert Barthelemy, a Natchitoches police officer. The officer buried the body in Winn Parish, where it was found on August 25, 2013. The officer and the victim both served in the Louisiana National Guard and apparently had a dispute over a woman.
2013-08-18	Seth Beckham (19)		Maryland (Forest Hill)	Seth Beckham broke into a 7-11, a McDonald's, and a gas station, while displaying aggressive and bizarre behavior. After the police officers drew their guns, Beckham reportedly tried to attack the officers. Seth Beckham was shot by a Harford County sheriff's deputy.
2013-08-17	Charles G. Carll (59)		Wisconsin (Madison)	Charles Carll was armed with a knife and reportedly attacked his wife with the knife. Police officers claim to have employed a taser, but it failed to restrain him. The man ignored the officers' verbal commands and was fatally shot by the officers. Authorities later determined the subject's wife was not injured and had never been threatened.
2013-08-15	Carlos Alcis (43)		New York (New York)	Alcis died of a heart attack after the police mistakenly raided his home in search of a cell phone thief. Aftermath: Alcis's family has filed a wrongful death suit against the city and the NYPD for $10 million
2013-08-15	Thomas McClanahan (46)	White	Kentucky (Fleming County)	Fleming County Sheriff's deputies responded to a domestic call. Thomas McClanahan came out of the house and pointed a gun at the officers. A state trooper fired his weapon, killing McClanahan.
2013-08-15	Eric McNeil (23)	Black	New Jersey (Trenton)	As police attempted to serve a warrant in a domestic violence investigation in a home, a man shot and wounded two police detectives. The officers returned fire and killed the suspect.
2013-08-14	Donny Simmons (37)	White	California (Hayward)	A domestic violence suspect was fatally shot by police in his apartment after charging at officers with a knife.
2013-08-14	Donald Peter Johnson (50)	White	Minnesota (Fort Ripley)	
2013-08-14	Leamond Ward (20)	White	Kentucky (Middlesboro)	
2013-08-14	Alex Cora De Jesus (35)	Hispanic	New Hampshire (Weare)	De Jesus was running away from the scene of a drug bust when he was shot in the temple by an officer. De Jesus was not armed. The attorney general investigated and was unable to determine if the killing was justified, but did issue a highly critical report. The city paid $300,000 to De Jesus' family in exchange for them not filing a wrongful death suit.
2013-08-13	Gary Roell (59)	White	Ohio (Cincinnati)	
2013-08-13	Harvey, Allen, Jr. (23)	Black	Maryland (Baltimore)	A burglary suspect ran into a van and sped off with it, striking and injuring a police officer. Three officers fired at the van, killing the driver.
2013-08-13	Ahmed, Fuaed Abdo (20)	White	Louisiana (St. Joseph)	Fuaed Abdo Ahmed took three bank employees hostage inside a bank for several hours. Ahmed released one hostage and, hours later, shot two of the hostages; one died, and the other was injured. Police then shot and killed Ahmed.
2013-08-13	Lucious Gaultney (33)	Unknown race	Mississippi (Gloster)	
2013-08-13	John David Tuck (62)	White	Colorado (Denver)	
2013-08-12	Lisa Taylor (44)	Unknown race	Florida (Cooper City)	
2013-08-12	Steven Michael Brill (46)	White	Pennsylvania (Manheim)	Steven M. Brill called 911, resulting in officers arriving at his home. Brill pointed an air rifle at the officers and refused to drop it after officers demanded him to. Two officers fired their weapons at Brill, killing him.
2013-08-12	Martin A. Duckworth (31)	Black	Washington (Seattle)	Martin A. Duckworth barged onto a bus and shot the driver five times in downtown Seattle. Duckworth then ran on foot and entered another bus, where he was followed by several police officers. Duckworth aimed his gun at officers, which led the officers to shoot the gunman at least a dozen times, fatally wounding him. Two officers were injured and several passengers on the bus were superficially injured from flying glass.
2013-08-11	Russell Donahue (44)	Black	Illinois (Poplar Grove)	Russell Donahue attempted to break into a home and shot through the door. Officers were called onto the scene, and two deputies fired at Donohue, killing him.
2013-08-11	Wayne Edwards (23)	Black	Massachusetts (Springfield)	Edwards was fatally wounded by a Massachusetts State Police trooper during an altercation. After the officer approached Edwards's vehicle at a traffic stop, Edwards reportedly became combative. Police began firing. Edwards then attempted to flee and crashed his vehicle. He was brought to Baystate Medical Center, where he died. A female passenger in the vehicle was treated for minor injuries and released the same night.
2013-08-10	James Lee DiMaggio (40)	White	Idaho (Ada County)	On August 4, 2013, an Amber alert was issued for 16-year-old Hannah Anderson and her 8-year-old brother, Ethan, after they were reported missing by their grandparents. Their mother was found burned to death along with Ethan Anderson at a house owned by James DiMaggio, in Boulevard, California. James DiMaggio was named a suspect in the murders and abduction of Hannah Anderson, which lead to manhunts being executed across the western U.S. On August 8, DiMaggio's car was found in central Idaho. On August 10, DiMaggio was found with Anderson at a campsite at Frank Church-River of No Return Wilderness and was fatally shot by an FBI agent during a confrontation. Hannah Anderson was unharmed.
2013-08-09	Robert Kaminski (62)	White	Florida (New Port Richey)	
2013-08-09	Michael Nehez (68)	White	California (Sunnyvale)	Michael Nehez stabbed his 55-year-old wife to death and then called 911. As police officers surrounded his house, Nehez ran towards them and charged at them with a knife. The officers fired at Nehez, killing him.
2013-08-09	James William Wallace (31)	White	Virginia (Carrollton)	
2013-08-09	Brent Walls (21)	White	Indiana (Indianapolis)	
2013-08-08	Montrell Moss (23)	Black	Indiana (Hammond)	
2013-08-08	Jeffery B. Lilly Jr. (22)	Black	Indiana (Indianapolis)	
2013-08-08	Michael Bitters (44)	White	Missouri (Kansas City)	A man wanted for an alleged parole violation was resisting arrest and then was shot by police. Information has not yet been released on whether or not the man shot had drawn a weapon.
2013-08-07	Roudy Hendricks (21)	Black	Massachusetts (Boston)	Boston drug control unit Officers Harry Jean and Terry Cotton were observing two men. An alleged shootout between officers and the men ensued. Both officers were wounded by gunfire, and one of the men was shot to death.
2013-08-07	Kevin Koonce (46)	White	Texas (Huntington)	
2013-08-06	Israel Hernandez (18)	Hispanic	Florida (Miami Beach)	At 5 a.m., Miami Beach police officers spotted Israel Hernandez spray-painting the side of a vacant McDonald's restaurant. After Hernandez saw police officers approaching him, he fled the area, leaving officers on a foot chase. According to Miami Beach police, Hernandez ignored the officers' commands to stop and then ran towards officer Jorge Mercado. An officer shocked Hernandez with a Taser, and he was unresponsive afterward. Hernandez was sent to a hospital and died at 6 a.m.
2013-08-06	Hector Leija (61)	Hispanic	New Mexico (Carlsbad)	Police were responding to a disturbance when they encountered a man who was allegedly armed with a gun. Officers shot and killed the man.
2013-08-05	Tobias J. Torres (35)	Hispanic	Arizona (Phoenix)	
2013-08-05	Rene Benito-Amaro (28)	Hispanic	Texas (Houston)	Officers M. Alanis and M. Newman were responding to a report of shots fired. They located a male suspect who fled on foot and allegedly shot at officers. Officer Alanis shot at the man and missed. Officer Newman located the man with a K-9 and shot and killed him.
2013-08-04	Chris Chipman (49)	White	Arizona (Mesa)	A man in a wheelchair was killed after Mesa police shot him during an altercation. The man pulled out his gun and officers responded by firing shots.
2013-08-04	Shaaliver Douse (14)	Black	New York (New York City)	Shaaliver Douse was shot by NYPD after he fired a gun at another fleeing male on a Bronx street.
2013-08-04	John Chavez (54)	Hispanic	New Mexico (Sandia Park)	
2013-08-03	Alvin McBride (41)	White	Arizona (Tucson)	
2013-08-03	Eric Marquez (26)	Hispanic	California (Huntington Beach)	Marquez was shot by a Huntington Beach police officer after he was exiting a vehicle while brandishing a firearm.
2013-08-02	Jon M. Sides (32)	White	Oklahoma (Warr Acres)	Jon Sides was shot and killed by a Warr Acres Police officer after a motorcycle chase that began in Warr Acres and ended in southwest Oklahoma City.

== See also ==
- Death in custody § United States
- Henry A. Wallace Police Crime Public Database
- List of cases of police brutality
- List of countries with annual rates and counts for killings by law enforcement officers
- List of law enforcement officers killed in the line of duty in the United States
- List of law enforcement officers convicted for an on-duty killing in the United States
- List of shootings by US immigration agents
- List of police reforms related to the George Floyd protests
- List of unarmed African Americans killed by law enforcement officers in the United States
- Lists of killings by law enforcement officers
- Police brutality in the United States
- Police misconduct § United States
- Police riot § United States
- Police use of deadly force in the United States
