= List of killings by law enforcement officers in China =

This is a list of killings by law enforcement officers in the People's Republic of China, including the special administrative regions of Hong Kong and Macau.

Date	Name(s) (age) of deceased	Province (city)	Description
17 March 2006	Tsui Po-ko (35)	Hong Kong (Tsim Sha Tsui)	Tsui, an off-duty police officer, ambushed two police officers with a handgun he had stolen from another officer in a murder five years prior. One of the ambushed officers, Constable Tsang Kwok-hang, was mortally wounded by Tsui, but was able to shoot and kill Tsui before succumbing to his wounds.
30 September 2006	Kelsang Namtso (17)	Tibet (Nangpa La)	Nangpa La shooting incident: Chinese border guards opened fire on a group of unarmed Tibetans attempting to flee the country via the Nangpa La pass, killing one and wounding several others.
7 January 2008	Wei Wenhua (41)	Hubei (Tianmen)	After attempting to film chengguan clashing with local villagers over illegal dumping by the former, Wei was taken into a vehicle and beaten to death by about thirty officers.
17 March 2009	Dil Bahadur Limbu (31)	Hong Kong (Ho Man Tin)	A police officer shot and killed a homeless man of Nepalese origin after he attacked the officer with a chair.
18 July 2011	multiple unnamed	Xinjiang (Hotan)	2011 Hotan attack: Fourteen attackers, who killed two hostages and two security guards, were killed in a firefight with police in Hotan, Xinjiang.
1 July 2012	Mr. Ban (Note: Given name not released.)	Guangdong (Shenzhen)	A police officer, Li Caikun, fatally shot a man after an argument during a previous encounter at Li's police station in Longgang District, Shenzhen. Li later filed a false police report claiming that the victim was involved in a robbery. Li was sentenced to death with reprieve for his crimes.
17 July 2013	Deng Zhengjia (56)	Hunan (Linwu)	Deng, a fruit vendor, was struck in the head by a chengguan officer with one of his scales' weights after a confrontation. He fell to the ground and was kicked by multiple officers while incapacitated, eventually succumbing to his injuries.
1 November 2013	Cai Wu	Guangxi (Guigang)	A plain-clothed police officer opened fire on the owners of a restaurant after a minor dispute, killing one and wounding the other. The officer, who police claim was drunk at the time of the incident, was charged with the killing. The deceased was five-months pregnant at the time.
5 May 2014	Ho Sai-tung (21)	Hong Kong (Lam Tin)	Two police officers opened fire on a man holding a security guard at knifepoint after he was about to attack his wife and a policewoman at Hong Nga Court, in Lam Tin.
12 August 2014	Tsewang Gonpo (60), Yeshe (42), Jinap Tharchin (18) and three others	Sichuan (Ganzi)	Police opened fire on protesters in Ganzi, wounding five, who were later taken into custody and allegedly tortured. All five succumbed to their untreated wounds. An officer was also killed by friendly fire during the incident.
3 November 2014	multiple unnamed	Guangdong (Guangzhou)	Two knife-wielding gang members attacked police during a routine inspection of an internet café, wounding six officers and civilians. Two days later, police discovered the attackers amongst a group of six gang members wielding knives. The police gave verbal warnings to the gang members and opened fire after they refused to put down their weapons and surrender. Three were killed, and the others were taken into custody.
5 November 2014	unnamed	Guangdong (Guangzhou)	A motorcycle taxi driver was shot and killed by police after he attempted to flee during a routine vehicle check in Yongtai New Village, Guangzhou. Motorcycle taxi services are illegal in the city.
12 January 2015	multiple unnamed	Xinjiang (Kashgar)	Six would-be suicide bombers were shot dead by police in Kashgar before they could detonate their devices.
19 July 2015	unnamed	Henan (Luoyang)	One construction worker was shot dead and another was injured during a protest after they attempted to attack and seize weapons from police.
20 November 2015	multiple unnamed	Xinjiang (Aksu)	Twenty-eight alleged terrorists were shot dead by police after a 56-day manhunt. One surrendered after the confrontation. The 29-member group was blamed for an attack on a coal mine in Aksu, in which 17 people were killed and 18 injured.
9 June 2016	unnamed	Guangdong (Foshan)	A police officer fired a warning shot while trying to resolve a dispute in Foshan; the bullet struck a man in an apartment above, killing him.
25 June 2018	Wang Zhihua (45)	Shandong (Yantai)	A man rammed a forklift into multiple vehicles at a bus station, injuring ten. He was fatally shot by police after prior attempts to stop him failed.
16 March 2019	unnamed (54)	Hong Kong	A knife-wielding man was shot dead by police after he slashed a shop manager.
22 March 2019	Cui Lidong (44)	Hubei (Zaoyang)	A man drove his car into pedestrians in Zaoyang, killing six, before he was shot dead by police.

== See also ==
- Lists of killings by law enforcement officers
