= List of killings by law enforcement officers in the United States, May 2017 =

This is a list of people reported killed by non-military law enforcement officers in the United States in May 2017, whether in the line of duty or not, and regardless of reason or method. The listing documents the occurrence of a death, making no implications regarding wrongdoing or justification on the part of the person killed or officer involved. Killings are arranged by date of the incident that caused death. Different death dates, if known, are noted in the description. The table below lists 94 people.

== May 2017 ==
Date	Name (age) of deceased	Race	State (city)	Description
2017-05-31	James Daniel Hill (17)	White	Colorado (Centennial)	
2017-05-31	James Gleason (24)	White	California (Hesperia)	
2017-05-29	Larry Warren Kipps (63)	Unknown race	West Virginia (Gerrardstown)	
2017-05-29	Joseph Godinez (20)	Hispanic	California (Vacaville)	
2017-05-29	Chad Dionne (37)	White	Maine (Arundel)	
2017-05-28	Jorge Alberto Fuentes (21)	Hispanic	Florida (Miami Beach)	
2017-05-28	Shaquian Tyrone Johnson (22)	Black	North Carolina (Cary)	
2017-05-28	Donald Sneed III (31)	White	Missouri (Raytown)	
2017-05-28	Francis De La Cruz (35)	Hispanic	California (San Jose)	Responding to a disturbance call at the Donner Lofts affordable housing complex, police were met by a mentally ill man who refused to open the door and instead set fire to the inside of the door. When police forced their way in and apprehended the other occupant, DeLaCruz advanced on the officers with an ax and was fatally shot.
2017-05-27	Ron Harlan Lewallen (30)	White	Tennessee (Oneida)	
2017-05-27	Dennis Ward (71)	White	Maine (Belfast)	
2017-05-27	Eduardo Valencia	Hispanic	Georgia (Austell)	
2017-05-26	Jamie J. Robinson (33)	Black	Missouri (St. Louis)	
2017-05-26	Joseph Zimmerman (34)	White	Arizona (Tucson)	
2017-05-26	Darius Smith (15)	Black	California (Arcadia)	
2017-05-26	Hector Gamboa (59)	Hispanic	New Mexico (San Rafael)	
2017-05-25	Shawn Buck (23)	White	Alaska (Fairbanks)	
2017-05-25	Adam Trammell (22)	Black	Wisconsin (West Milwaukee)	A neighbor called the police when Trammell, who had a history of schizophrenia, caused a disturbance in their shared hallway. Police officers broke down Trammell’s door, tased him in the shower 15 times and gave him sedatives. The medical examiner said that the use of sedatives and the Taser use were contributing factors in Trammell's death.
2017-05-24	Hayden J. Stutz (24)	White	Ohio (Canton)	
2017-05-24	Luis Garcia	Hispanic	California (Compton)	
2017-05-24	John Eno (59)	White	California (South San Francisco)	
2017-05-23	Albert Gagnier (74)	White	Tennessee (Knoxville)	
2017-05-23	Jorge Alberto Fuentes (21)	Hispanic	Arizona (Phoenix)	
2017-05-23	Aaron M. Thompson (31)	White	Idaho (Mountain Home)	
2017-05-23	Michael Anthony Bonini (65)	White	Nevada (Pahrump)	
2017-05-22	Kelly Pastrana (38)	White	Massachusetts (Chelsea)	
2017-05-22	Maurice Ifill (43)	Black	Delaware (Wilmington)	
2017-05-21	Jimmie Montel Sanders (33)	Black	Wisconsin (Appleton)	
2017-05-21	Joseph Hodgin (43)	White	Pennsylvania (Allentown)	
2017-05-21	Carlos Garcia Petrovich (37)	Hispanic	Florida (Okeechobee)	
2017-05-21	DeRicco Devante Holden (24)	Black	Louisiana (Converse)	
2017-05-20	Anthony Paul "Tony" Ardo (47)	White	Pennsylvania (Bangor)	
2017-05-20	Shannon Edward Estill (58)	White	California (Pleasanton)	
2017-05-20	Mark Roshawn Adkins (54)	Black	California (Lemon Grove)	
2017-05-19	Roger Bubar (65)	White	Maine (Belgrade)	
2017-05-19	Jayden Young (18)	Black	Arizona (Glendale)	
2017-05-18	Daniel George Boak (28)	White	Virginia (Arlington)	
2017-05-18	Deonte Marces Giles (22)	Black	Georgia (Columbus)	
2017-05-17	Rashad S. Wells Jr. (17)	Black	Illinois (Chicago)	
2017-05-16	Edwin Fuentes (24)	Hispanic	California (Tustin)	
2017-05-16	Isabelle Duval (41)	White	DC (Washington)	
2017-05-16	Marshall Barrus (38)	White	Montana (Clinton)	
2017-05-16	Tristan Long (25)	Black	Arizona (Tempe)	
2017-05-15	Jonie Block (27)	Black	Arizona (Phoenix)	
2017-05-15	Keith Andrew Chesser (48)	White	Oklahoma (Wewoka)	
2017-05-15	Jaison Fitzgerald (29)	Black	Virginia (Richmond)	
2017-05-15	Omar Emilio Benitez (22)	Hispanic	California (Long Beach)	
2017-05-15	Buford Shane Whitson (47)	White	Tennessee (Johnson City)	
2017-05-15	Emmanuel Omar Ibarra (34)	Hispanic	California (Del Mar)	
2017-05-14	Tashii S. Brown (40)	Black	Nevada (Las Vegas)	
2017-05-14	David Jay Juarez (41)	Hispanic	Arizona (Kingman)	
2017-05-14	James Burton Sr. (48)	White	Virginia (Pulaski)	
2017-05-13	Clarence E. Coats Jr. (41)	Black	Missouri (Columbia)	
2017-05-13	Maxwell Holt (37)	White	Wisconsin (West Allis)	
2017-05-13	Tywon Salters (21)	Black	Illinois (Geneva)	
2017-05-12	Adrian Gonzalez (27)	Hispanic	Texas (Houston)	
2017-05-12	Jonathan David Victor (35)	White	Alabama (Robertsdale)	
2017-05-12	Douglas Almond Wiggington (48)	White	Indiana (Greenfield)	Officers Sgt. Rodney Vawter and Officer Dillon Silver with the Greenfield Police Department responded to a 911 call for help for an intoxicated man lying in the grass they found Wiggington who was incoherent and unable to follow their orders. Wiggington can be heard on the audio recording struggling to answer Silver’s questions, slurring his words. He became combative when the officers tried to roll him on his stomach. The officers shot him twice with a Taser. The death certificate states the man died from “a discharge from a conducted electrical weapon. The Department cleared both officers of any wrongdoing but the family said it would be seeking justice since a bystander called for help for Wiggington who was alive before the officers used the taser.
2017-05-12	Ronald Singletary (51)	Black	Pennsylvania (Philadelphia)	
2017-05-12	Ryan Lowell (30)	White	Montana (Billings)	
2017-05-12	Branch Wroth (41)	White	California (Rohnert Park)	
2017-05-12	Phillip Byron O'Shea (46)	White	Florida (Jupiter)	
2017-05-11	Gabriel Ramirez	Hispanic	Texas (Arlington)	
2017-05-10	Terrell Kyreem Johnson (24)	Black	Oregon (Portland)	
2017-05-10	Robin White (50)	Black	Missouri (St. Louis)	
2017-05-10	Jeroen Peter Koornwinder (50)	White	California (Lakeside)	
2017-05-10	Joseph Perez (41)	Hispanic	California (Fresno)	
2017-05-09	Jayson Negron (15)	Hispanic	Connecticut (Bridgeport)	Negron was shot after police claim he tried to flee from a one-way street in a stolen car. After officer James Boulay shot one of the cars tires, he opened the door and apprehended Negron. After Boulay was hit by the car's open door, which was moving backwards, he fatally shot Negron.
2017-05-09	Joseph Jaster (40)	White	Colorado (Westminster)	
2017-05-09	John Bittle (39)	White	South Carolina (Lexington)	
2017-05-09	Ian Thomas Little (36)	White	Michigan (Brighton)	
2017-05-09	Terry Percy Campbell (25)	Black	Florida (Jacksonville)	
2017-05-09	Scott Bloomfield (34)	White	Ohio (Tiffin)	
2017-05-08	Mikel Laney Mcintyre (32)	Black	California (Rancho Cordova)	
2017-05-08	Anthony David Soderberg (29)	White	California (Los Angeles)	A man who broke into a woman's home barricaded himself after she called the police. He armed himself with a gun that belonged to one of the residents. An LAPD SWAT team was dispatched to the home, which was surrounded by bushes and was located at the top of a hill. A helicopter was used to survey the home. At first, officers used a bullhorn to convince the suspect to surrender. After no response, tear gas was launched. The suspect then opened fire at the police, including the helicopter. Officers returned fire, killing him. It is believed that the fatal shot was fired by a sniper who was in the helicopter.
2017-05-07	Cedric Jamal Mifflin (27)	Black	Alabama (Phenix City)	
2017-05-07	Landon Nobles (24)	Black	Texas (Austin)	
2017-05-07	Jose Hernandez-Rossy (26)	Hispanic	New York (Buffalo)	
2017-05-06	Jacob Peterson (15)	White	California (San Diego)	A 15-year old male student at Torrey Pines High School called 911, requesting officers to perform a welfare check. Two officers arrived and spotted him in the front parking lot. As they were exiting their cruisers, he pulled out an air pistol and pointed it at the officers. Officers opened fire on him. First aid was rendered, and the boy was pronounced dead at the hospital. The police suspected that the boy intended to commit suicide-by-cop because of a note found on his body.
2017-05-06	Steven Allen Price (62)	White	Nevada (Las Vegas)	
2017-05-06	Nicholas A. Provenza (25)	White	Florida (Tarpon Springs)	
2017-05-05	Tizaya Jordan-Robinson (25)	Black	Massachusetts (Braintree)	
2017-05-04	Jonathan Salcido (27)	Hispanic	California (Whittier)	Salcido's mother called police to assist her in getting him to a hospital. Salico suffered from mental illness, Salico's mother had called the police for assistance several times in the past. Officers wrestled Salcido to the ground, where he died.
2017-05-04	Lucille Espinosa (54)	Hispanic	Texas (Katy)	
2017-05-03	Malik Carey (18)	Black	Michigan (Grand Rapids)	According to Grand Rapids police, the 18-year-old victim was a probation violator and he has been shot and killed in an exchange of gunfire with officers after he allegedly refused to comply with officers' commands, produced a handgun and fired at the officers.
2017-05-03	Mirza Tatlic (24)	White	California (San Jose)	
2017-05-03	Nicholas Flusche (26)	White	California (San Francisco)	Police officers encountered a stabbing in process and shot Flusche, who died at the scene.
2017-05-03	Joseph Tourino (28)	Native Hawaiian and Pacific Islander	California (San Jose)	
2017-05-03	William Deen (67)	White	Georgia (Peachtree City)	
2017-05-02	Rodney L. Henderson (48)	Black	Texas (Irving)	
2017-05-01	James Edward Ray (41)		Michigan (Detroit)	Police officers responded to a domestic violence call, when Ray shot one officer. Ray was shot multiple times when the officers returned fire. He died at the scene.
2017-05-01	Peter Selis (49)		California (San Diego)	Police received report of a man shooting people by the swimming pool, upon arriving they saw the suspect still in the pool area and he appeared to be reloading. Three officers shot the suspect after he allegedly pointed the gun at them.
2017-05-01	Jason Sebastian Roque (20)	Hispanic	Texas (Austin)	
2017-05-01	Joseph William Alain (25)	White	Texas (Conroe)	

== See also ==
- Death in custody § United States
- Henry A. Wallace Police Crime Public Database
- List of cases of police brutality
- List of countries with annual rates and counts for killings by law enforcement officers
- List of law enforcement officers killed in the line of duty in the United States
- List of law enforcement officers convicted for an on-duty killing in the United States
- List of shootings by US immigration agents
- List of police reforms related to the George Floyd protests
- List of unarmed African Americans killed by law enforcement officers in the United States
- Lists of killings by law enforcement officers
- Police brutality in the United States
- Police misconduct § United States
- Police riot § United States
- Police use of deadly force in the United States
