= List of killings by law enforcement officers in the United States, December 2018 =

This is a list of people reported killed by non-military law enforcement officers in the United States in December 2018, whether in the line of duty or not, and regardless of reason or method. The listing documents the occurrence of a death, making no implications regarding wrongdoing or justification on the part of the person killed or officer involved. Killings are arranged by date of the incident that caused death. Different death dates, if known, are noted in the description. The table below lists 99 people.

== December 2018 ==
Date	Name (and age) of deceased	Race	State (city)	Description
2018-12-31	Rony Parras-Mendez (18)	Hispanic	California (Los Angeles)	Two LAPD officers responded to multiple 911 calls about a woman screaming for help during an argument in the street. When law enforcement arrived at the scene they were approached by the woman as well as a neighbor who had been injured while trying to intervene. The witnesses directed the officers to the apartment, where they were greeted by a teenager holding a knife. After refusing to drop his weapon and approaching the officers, Rony Parras-Mendez was shot and killed by one of the officers.
2018-12-31	Iosia Faletogo (30)	Native Hawaiian or Pacific Islander	Seattle, WA	
2018-12-31	Brant Hartung (62)	White	Waterville, PA	
2018-12-31	Robert Daniel Barger (26)	Unknown	Stone Mountain, GA	
2018-12-31	Jesus Ramos (34)	Hispanic	Longmont, CO	
2018-12-31	Matthew Hurley (45)	White	Dayton, IA	
2018-12-30	Kerry D. Blake (44)	Black	Rockford, IL	
2018-12-30	Warren Jay Beaubien (49)	White	Llano, TX	
2018-12-29	Mark Nicholas Farrell (33)	Unknown race	Beatty, OR	
2018-12-29	Nathan Shepard	Unknown race	Golden, MS	
2018-12-29	Christopher L. Kelley (42)	White	St. Joseph, MO	
2018-12-29	Paul Arbitelle (45)	White	Connecticut (Danbury)	Police attempted to use a stun gun, but it was ineffective. He was shot and killed after charging at police with a knife. Arbitelle's mother was wounded, but survived.
2018-12-28	Glenn Rightsell (57)	White	Indiana (Montgomery County)	Rightsell was working on his truck when he was confronted by Indiana State deputies. Police claim he reached for his gun, but no bodycam footage has been provided as of December 2020. The ISP deputies fatally shot Rightsell, who died hours later in the hospital.
2018-12-28	Shane Lyons (35)	Black	Port Arthur, TX	
2018-12-28	David McNabb (43)	White	Orcutt, CA	
2018-12-28	Mark Wade Luttrell Jr. (34)	White	Tullahoma, TN	
2018-12-28	Edwin C. Bundy (46)	White	Arizona (Phoenix)	
2018-12-27	Erich Stelzer (25)	White	Massachusetts (Cohasset)	YouTube bodybuilder Stelzer was tased four times during arrest and later died.
2018-12-26	Wayne Falana Jr. (26 or 35)	Black	Florida (Clearwater)	Falana allegedly told his girlfriend that both she and he were going to die, and started beating her. She called police through the Facebook Messenger app on her phone. Police responding were fired upon from inside the house by Falana, and they returned fire. In the ensuing gun battle Falana broke through the window and continued to shoot at police. The officers ended up shooting Falana 16 times, eventually killing him. None of the officers were seriously hurt. Falana was iliegaly living in Clearwater and was also in unlawful possession of marijuana and firearms.
2018-12-26	Michael Jerome Taylor (17)	Black	Lakeland, FL	
2018-12-26	Gary Warbritton (21)	White	Rector, AR	
2018-12-25	Jennifer Vasquez (24)	Hispanic	San Jose, CA	
2018-12-25	Antonio A. Ramos (34)	Hispanic	Buckeye, AZ	
2018-12-24	Abdias Flores (35)	Hispanic	New Mexico (Albuquerque)	
2018-12-23	Kaulana "Toji" Reinhardt (26)	Native Hawaiian or Pacific Islander	Wailuku, HI	
2018-12-23	Jason Perez (36)	Hispanic	New Mexico (Albuquerque)	
2018-12-21	Jose Lemus (57)	Hispanic	Azusa, CA	
2018-12-21	Ronald Scott Jenkins (55)	White	Lexington, SC	
2018-12-20	David MacAdams (56)	White	Panama City, FL	
2018-12-20	Damon Barstad (23)	White	Toledo, OH	
2018-12-20	Unknown	Unknown	Lake Elsinore, CA	
2018-12-19	Angel Ocampo-Soto	Hispanic	Arizona (Phoenix)	
2018-12-19	Theresa Kay Strawn (54)	White	Valrico, FL	
2018-12-19	Courtney Breanne Strawn (32)	White	Plant City, FL	
2018-12-19	Londyn Faith Strawn (6)	White	Valrico, FL	
2018-12-19	Keith A. Hawley (27)	White	Union City, PA	
2018-12-19	Daniel Geiger (32)	Unknown race	Fort Worth, TX	
2018-12-18	David Alexander Frederick (24)	White	Terre Haute, IN	
2018-12-18	Mitchell J. Hammer (27)	White	Palmyra, PA	
2018-12-18	Danny Washington (27)	Black	Franklin Township, PA	
2018-12-18	Angel Viola Decarlo (31)	Black	Hopewell, VA	
2018-12-17	Jose Manuel Cardenas Jr. (34)	Hispanic	Arizona (Phoenix)	
2018-12-17	Travis York (42)	White	Sacramento, CA	
2018-12-17	David Anthony Baker (32)	Black	Aurora, CO	
2018-12-16	Edward Rudhman (50)	White	Arizona (Mesa)	
2018-12-16	Jacob Mohow (35)	White	Oklahoma (Oklahoma City)	
2018-12-16	Richard L. Johnson (46)	Black	Kansas City, KS	
2018-12-16	Rodney J. "Rod" Geiser (60)	White	Apple Creek, OH	
2018-12-16	April Webster (47)	Black	South Carolina (Darlington County)	Deputies responded to a 911 call from Elizabeth Gainey about her wife, who was trying to harm herself. Officers were met by a woman holding a knife and proceeded to shoot her three times. She later died at a hospital and was identified as 47-year-old April Webster. Gainey later told a local news outlet that, prior to the shooting, law enforcement told her they would defuse the situation using non-lethal methods. According to family members, Webster had bipolar disorder as well as schizophrenia.
2018-12-15	Walter Kellogg (57)	White	Shirley, NY	
2018-12-15	Edgar Espinoza (35)	Hispanic	Hanford, CA	
2018-12-14	Terrance Ryan (66)	White	Yakima, WA	
2018-12-14	Sean Sharpe (54)	Unknown race	Newark, NJ	
2018-12-13	Artur Kaneev	Hispanic	Upland, CA	
2018-12-13	Andre Horton (42)	Black	Tennessee (Memphis)	
2018-12-13	Brandon Jermaine Taylor (33)	Unknown	Decatur, GA	
2018-12-13	Adam Wayne Smith (35)	White	Oregon House, CA	
2018-12-13	Salvatore Tirone (70)	Hispanic	Wildwood, FL	
2018-12-12	Demario Bass (29)	Black	St. Louis, MO	
2018-12-12	Jason Emerson Connell (43)	White	Florida (Jacksonville)	
2018-12-12	Gabriel Romero (19)	Hispanic	New Mexico (Albuquerque)	
2018-12-12	Dylan Parker Thomas (18)	White	Florida (Jacksonville)	
2018-12-11	Brenda Thomas (56)	Unknown	Jonesboro, AR	
2018-12-11	Tori Mikaila Kaneshiro (30)	Native Hawaiian	Puna, HI	
2018-12-11	Haze Connor Martin (22)	White	Atkins, AR	
2018-12-11	Marcus Neal (47)	Black	Buffalo, NY	
2018-12-11	Kaley Gay (25)	White	Lizella, GA	
2018-12-11	Tameka LaShay Simpson (27)	Black	Calhoun, GA	
2018-12-10	George Penev (23)	White	Fredonia, NY	
2018-12-10	Daniel Pierce (58)	White	Rangely, CO	
2018-12-10	Faustino Dioso (50)	Unknown	New York (Staten Island)	Two officers responded to a domestic disturbance where they were confronted by a drunk man wielding a knife. The man refused to drop the knife and goaded the police to shoot him. After charging at the officers the individual was shot 10-12 times, killing him. One of the officers was shot in the stomach in what appeared to be friendly fire, but was expected to recover. The individual killed was later identified as 50-year-old Faustino Dioso.
2018-12-10	Kyle Hart (33)	White	Redwood City, CA	
2018-12-09	Christopher DeAndre Mitchell (23)	Black	Torrance, CA	
2018-12-09	Quinntin Andrew Castro (35)	Black	Tulare, CA	
2018-12-09	Shane Adair Wentling (39)	White	Perry, OK	
2018-12-09	Terry Don King (50)	White	Springdale, AR	
2018-12-09	Leslie Vaughan (51)	White	Palatine, IL	
2018-12-08	Joshua Boyd (24)	Black	Savannah, GA	
2018-12-08	James Robertson (41)	White	Wendover, NV	
2018-12-07	Ricardo Trevino lll (21)	Hispanic	San Benito, TX	
2018-12-07	Julius Ervin Tate Jr. (16)	Black	Columbus, OH	
2018-12-07	Jesus Lainez (51)	Hispanic	Fort Pierce, FL	
2018-12-06	Benjamin David Larson (42)	White	Pacheco, CA	
2018-12-06	Dimaggio McNelly (53)	Black	Mcdonough, GA	
2018-12-06	Jason Paul O'Bannon (46)	White	Pahrump, NV	
2018-12-05	Richard Posadas (26)	Hispanic	Arvin, CA	
2018-12-05	Paul Ridgeway (41)	White	Martinez, CA	
2018-12-05	De'Trell Crews (23)	Black	St. Louis, MO	
2018-12-05	Justin Smith (41)	White	Philadelphia, PA	
2018-12-05	David Alejandro Molina (27)	Hispanic	Napa, CA	
2018-12-05	Anthony M. Edwards (33)	Black	Richmond, VA	
2018-12-05	Willie Earl Wright	Black	Dallas, TX	
2018-12-04	Anthony Ray Borden-Cortez (18)	Hispanic	Ogden, UT	
2018-12-02	Unknown name	Unknown race	Dallas, TX	
2018-12-02	Antonio Jaso Aguilar (28)	Hispanic	Center, TX	
2018-12-01	Demontry Floytra Boyd (43)	Black	Nevada (Las Vegas)	A driver was shot and killed after disobeying an officer's orders and reaching towards his waist during a traffic stop. The deceased individual was later identified as 43-year-old Demontry Floytra Boyd.
2018-12-01	Michael Taylor	White	Water Valley, MS	
2018-12-01	Jarvis Randall (30)	Black	Tamarac, FL	
2018-12-01	John Young (65)	Black	Pensacola, FL	

== See also ==
- Death in custody § United States
- Henry A. Wallace Police Crime Public Database
- List of cases of police brutality
- List of countries with annual rates and counts for killings by law enforcement officers
- List of law enforcement officers killed in the line of duty in the United States
- List of law enforcement officers convicted for an on-duty killing in the United States
- List of shootings by US immigration agents
- List of police reforms related to the George Floyd protests
- List of unarmed African Americans killed by law enforcement officers in the United States
- Lists of killings by law enforcement officers
- Police brutality in the United States
- Police misconduct § United States
- Police riot § United States
- Police use of deadly force in the United States
