= List of killings by law enforcement officers in the United States, October 2021 =

This is a list of people reported killed by non-military law enforcement officers in the United States in October 2021, whether in the line of duty or not, and regardless of reason or method. The listing documents the occurrence of a death, making no implications regarding wrongdoing or justification on the part of the person killed or officer involved. Killings are arranged by date of the incident that caused death. Different death dates, if known, are noted in the description. The table below lists 109 people.

== October 2021 ==
| Date | Name (age) of deceased | Race | Location | Description |
|---|---|---|---|---|
| 2021-10-31 | Melkon Michaelidis (46) | White | Los Angeles, CA | |
| 2021-10-31 | Glenn William Custer (59) | White | West Hanover Township, PA | |
| 2021-10-30 | Joseph Shane Endicott (41) | White | Joplin, MO | |
| 2021-10-30 | Matthew Riggs (50) | Unknown race | Cleveland, TN | |
| 2021-10-30 | Jason Jones (29) | White | Catskill Village, New York | Jones walked into the Catskill Police building and got into a confrontation with officers. After Jones doused himself with hand sanitizer, an officer tased him, causing him to burst into flames. Jones was hospitalized and was pronounced dead on December 15. |
| 2021-10-29 | Christopher Zike (51) | White | Boston, Massachusetts | An off-duty Massachusetts State Trooper lost control while driving a Ford Explorer and stopped perpendicular on Interstate 93 South against the median barrier. Moments after, Zike hit the SUV while riding his motorcycle and later died. The SUV's passenger said the trooper had "six to seven" drinks before driving and had tried to kiss her moments before the crash. The trooper, who had graduated from the academy a week prior, was relieved of duty, fired, and charged with motor vehicle homicide while OUI and negligent operation of a motor vehicle. |
| 2021-10-29 | Name Withheld | Unknown race | Jackson, MS | |
| 2021-10-28 | Elwood Dwyer (52) | White | Sioux Falls, SD | |
| 2021-10-28 | Ahmad Akeem Abdul Muhammad (30) | Black | Colorado Springs, CO | |
| 2021-10-28 | Dewey Dale Wilfong III (28) | White | Chelsea, IA | |
| 2021-10-27 | Koffi Dzima (31) | Black | Philadelphia, PA | |
| 2021-10-27 | Zachary Snow (26) | White | Boise, ID | |
| 2021-10-27 | Robert Richart (56) | White | Austin, TX | |
| 2021-10-26 | Scott S. Wright (57) | White | Painesville, OH | |
| 2021-10-26 | Ivan Foster (27) | Black | Louisville, KY | |
| 2021-10-25 | Jacob Bergguist (27) | White | Boise, ID | |
| 2021-10-25 | Kristopher M. Kramer (33) | White | DeKalb, IL | |
| 2021-10-25 | Corey Timothy Stanley (37) | Black | Miami, FL | |
| 2021-10-24 | Nicholas Smith (35) | Unknown race | Conway, AR | |
| 2021-10-24 | Kim Douglas Ropp (60) | Black | Kentwood, MI | |
| 2021-10-24 | Arthur Hunt (44) | Unknown race | Hopkinsville, KY | |
| 2021-10-23 | Clayburn Elwood Grant (34) | Native American | Hays, MT | |
| 2021-10-23 | Leon T. Perry (28) | Black | Tulsa, OK | |
| 2021-10-22 | Christian Valdez (23) | Hispanic | Rialto, CA | |
| 2021-10-22 | Yordany Rodriguez Perez (25) | Hispanic | Doral, FL | |
| 2021-10-22 | Gregory Gene Goodall (35) | White | Sanger, TX | |
| 2021-10-21 | Michael Raymond Hilton (34) | White | Caryville, TN | |
| 2021-10-21 | Sierra J. Stricker (24) | Unknown race | Lincoln, NE | |
| 2021-10-20 | Jesse Fischer (40) | White | Arlington, Texas | An officer attempted to pull over Fischer for drunk driving. According to police chief Al Jones, the officer exited his vehicle and shot Fischer as he drove around a cul-de-sac. The officer was fired several days later for violating department policy regarding stepping in front of moving vehicles. In June 2022 the officer was indicted on a murder charge. |
| 2021-10-20 | Jarvis Jarrette (32) | Black | Atlanta, GA | |
| 2021-10-20 | Aaron Leo Lang (38) | White | Aurora, CO | |
| 2021-10-20 | Allison Lakie (33) | White | Syracuse, NY | |
| 2021-10-19 | Name Withheld | White | Pensacola, FL | |
| 2021-10-19 | Richard Thomas (41) | White | Golden Valley, NV | |
| 2021-10-19 | Betty Jane Tibaldi (54) | White | Pocono Township, PA | |
| 2021-10-19 | Daniel DiMillo (51) | White | Falmouth, ME | |
| 2021-10-19 | Carey David Hammond | White | Evansville, IN | |
| 2021-10-18 | Reiner Sommer (50) | White | Las Vegas, Nevada | Police responded to reports of a man acting erratic. Officers took Sommer into custody, after which he was handcuffed and restrained. He fell unresponsive and died at the hospital. His death was ruled a homicide due to police restraint, with methamphetamine, heart disease, and obesity also playing a role. |
| 2021-10-18 | Deandre Johnson (30) | Black | Washington, DC | |
| 2021-10-18 | Shawn Delemore Dempsey (32) | White | Dingess, WV | |
| 2021-10-17 | Kfin Karuo (28) | Native Hawaiian and Pacific Islander | Vancouver, WA | |
| 2021-10-17 | Christofer Conner (40) | White | Fort Smith, AR | |
| 2021-10-17 | Allan Lorenzo Robb (33) | Black | West Palm Beach, FL | |
| 2021-10-17 | Douglas Knakmuhs (40) | White | Springfield, MO | |
| 2021-10-16 | Guillermo Gonzalez-Gonzalez (20) | Hispanic | Laredo, TX | |
| 2021-10-16 | Joshua Dewayne Hammock (30) | White | Estero, FL | |
| 2021-10-16 | Alexander King (17) | White | Tarpon Springs, FL | |
| 2021-10-15 | Michael Edward Nelson Jr. (42) | White | Milpitas, CA | |
| 2021-10-14 | Robert Allen Maness (39) | Unknown race | Anderson, SC | |
| 2021-10-14 | Jermaine Harris (32) | Black | Tarboro, NC | |
| 2021-10-14 | Russell Leggett (30) | White | Palm Springs, CA | |
| 2021-10-14 | Calvin Wilks Jr. (40) | Black | Crestview, Florida | Police responded to reports of a man calling for help and encountered Wilks at his home. Police tased Wilks, after which he became unresponsive and died the following day at a hospital. The death was ruled a homicide and three officers were indicted on manslaughter charges. |
| 2021-10-13 | Jamie Liang (24) | Asian | New York City, New York | An off-duty NYPD officer allegedly shot her ex-girlfriend and her ex's new girlfriend, Liang, at the ex's home in Bensonhurst, Brooklyn. The officer was arrested and charged with murder. The ex-girlfriend was hospitalized but is in stable condition. |
| 2021-10-13 | Jim Rogers (54) | Black | Pittsburgh, Pennsylvania | Police responded to a report of a stolen bicycle, although the bike's owner stated she was selling the bike and would have given it to Rogers, who had taken it and returned it to her home. Police tased Rogers eight times, after which he fell unconscious, later dying in the hospital the day after. Rogers's death was ruled an accident and five officers were fired for their role in his death. |
| 2021-10-13 | Carlos Arias (36) | Hispanic | Los Angeles, CA | |
| 2021-10-13 | Dustin Paradis (34) | White | Augusta, ME | |
| 2021-10-13 | Steven David Schumann (40) | White | Plainwell, MI | |
| 2021-10-13 | Name Withheld (46) | Unknown race | Geary, OK | |
| 2021-10-13 | Buddy Byron McKenzie (41) | White | McCammon, ID | |
| 2021-10-13 | Bobby Jo Klum (37) | White | Davenport, IA | |
| 2021-10-12 | Jonathan Combs (40) | White | Anderson, SC | |
| 2021-10-12 | Mario Lawrence Martinez (43) | Hispanic | Las Vegas, NV | |
| 2021-10-12 | Bryan Lee (43) | White | Knoxville, TN | |
| 2021-10-11 | Jovan Lewis Singleton (36) | Black | Woodlawn, MD | |
| 2021-10-11 | Jermaine Marshell Jones Jr. (24) | Black | Augusta, GA | |
| 2021-10-10 | Joshua Ebinger (37) | White | Sunman, IN | |
| 2021-10-10 | Perry Lamar Stringfellow Jr. (50) | White | Sylacauga, AL | |
| 2021-10-10 | Michael Beck (57) | White | Leland, NC | |
| 2021-10-10 | Isaiah Guevara (18) | Hispanic | Whittier, CA | |
| 2021-10-09 | Angel Acevedo Jr. (40) | Hispanic | Tinton Falls, New Jersey | An off-duty officer was driving to work on a highway when his truck drifted off and struck the car of a Baltimore couple. Both died at the scene. Prosecutors say the officer was under the influence at the time. |
| 2021-10-09 | Daniela Correia Salles (35) | Hispanic | Tinton Falls, New Jersey | An off-duty officer was driving to work on a highway when his truck drifted off and struck the car of a Baltimore couple. Both died at the scene. Prosecutors say the officer was under the influence at the time. |
| 2021-10-09 | Timothy Houston (35) | White | Middlesboro, KY | |
| 2021-10-09 | Gustavo Esparza (35) | Hispanic | Las Cruces, NM | |
| 2021-10-09 | Michael Carothers (17) | Black | Austin, TX | |
| 2021-10-09 | Calvin Robinson (52) | Black | Gluckstadt, MS | |
| 2021-10-09 | Travis Daniel Carlon (32) | Unknown race | Lompoc, CA | |
| 2021-10-08 | Rudy Anderson (45) | Unknown race | Los Angeles, CA | |
| 2021-10-08 | Lance Stelzer (30) | Unknown race | Goetz, WI | |
| 2021-10-08 | Isaac Louis Soria (28) | Hispanic | Rancho, CA | |
| 2021-10-08 | Brian Umana (28) | Hispanic | National City, CA | |
| 2021-10-08 | Scott W. Hottinger (35) | White | Salcha, AK | |
| 2021-10-08 | Derrick Clinton (27) | Black | Indian Land, SC | |
| 2021-10-08 | Ramone Javaris Dwight (29) | Black | Hagan, GA | |
| 2021-10-08 | Demetrio Antaus Jackson (43) | Black | Altoona, WI | |
| 2021-10-07 | Johan Quintero (22) | Hispanic | Wentzville, MO | |
| 2021-10-07 | Lloyd Grant McClung Jr. | White | Cleveland, TN | |
| 2021-10-06 | Andra Devon Murphy (43) | Black | Bolivar, TN | |
| 2021-10-06 | Guillermo San Miguel Sanchez (25) | Hispanic | Weslaco, TX | |
| 2021-10-06 | Fidel Bedolla (55) | Hispanic | Bakersfield, CA | |
| 2021-10-06 | Simran Gordon (24) | Black | Rochester, NY | |
| 2021-10-05 | Nurgazy Mamyrov (27) | White | Greene Township, PA | |
| 2021-10-05 | Donte Lorenzo Laster (23) | Black | Tucson, AZ | |
| 2021-10-05 | Corey Daniel Wellman (40) | Black | Nashville, TN | |
| 2021-10-05 | Jesse Medrano (35) | Hispanic | Lynwood, CA | |
| 2021-10-05 | Daniel Garcia (43) | Hispanic | Corpus Christi, Texas | U.S. Marshals were serving an arrest warrant against Garcia for cocaine distribution when he was shot and killed. Officials say Garcia was unarmed and Marshals believed he was reaching for a gun when he was shot, although no gun was found. |
| 2021-10-04 | Michael Craig (61) | Black | Chicago, Illinois | Craig called police during a domestic dispute saying that his wife had a knife to his throat. Body cam footage shows an officer enter the apartment and speak to their son, who says that his mother has a knife. The officer then found Craig and his wife fighting, and fired both his gun and taser, hitting Craig. An attorney says that Craig was the domestic violence victim, and that he had been stabbed several times before police arrived. |
| 2021-10-04 | Demetrius Deshawn Roberts (21) | Black | Las Vegas, Nevada | Officers were responding to a domestic dispute were fired at by Roberts. After returning fire, they followed him and shot and killed him. |
| 2021-10-04 | Paul J. Weeden (66) | Unknown | Walton, New York | A police officer responding to a mental health call shot and killed Weeden after he allegedly pointed what appeared to be a gun at police. |
| 2021-10-04 | R.V. Johnson II (22) | Black | Galesburg, MI | |
| 2021-10-04 | Chad Allen Jenkins (50) | White | St. Petersburg, FL | |
| 2021-10-04 | Shane Hartman | White | Houma, LA | |
| 2021-10-04 | Darrion Taylor (26) | Black | Tucson, AZ | |
| 2021-10-03 | Adrian Zarate-Cervantes (41) | Hispanic | Las Vegas, NV | |
| 2021-10-03 | Christopher Mosco (32) | White | Stevenson Ranch, CA | |
| 2021-10-03 | David Jacques | Unknown race | Colorado Springs, CO | |
| 2021-10-03 | Jess Jackson (41) | White | Wichita, KS | |
| 2021-10-02 | Wade Anthony Adams Sr. (58) | White | Westwego, LA | |
| 2021-10-01 | Buster Lee Carpenter (32) | White | Rogersville, TN | |
| 2021-10-01 | James Michael Farris (27) | White | Chattanooga, TN | |

== See also ==
- Death in custody § United States
- Henry A. Wallace Police Crime Public Database
- List of cases of police brutality
- List of countries with annual rates and counts for killings by law enforcement officers
- List of law enforcement officers killed in the line of duty in the United States
- List of law enforcement officers convicted for an on-duty killing in the United States
- List of shootings by US immigration agents
- List of police reforms related to the George Floyd protests
- List of unarmed African Americans killed by law enforcement officers in the United States
- Lists of killings by law enforcement officers
- Police brutality in the United States
- Police misconduct § United States
- Police riot § United States
- Police use of deadly force in the United States
