= List of killings by law enforcement officers in the United States, June 2017 =

This is a list of people reported killed by non-military law enforcement officers in the United States in June 2017, whether in the line of duty or not, and regardless of reason or method. The listing documents the occurrence of a death, making no implications regarding wrongdoing or justification on the part of the person killed or officer involved. Killings are arranged by date of the incident that caused death. Different death dates, if known, are noted in the description. The table below lists 91 people.

== June 2017 ==
Date	Name (age) of deceased	Race	State (city)	Description
2017-06-30	Brett Rodriguez (33)	Hispanic	Colorado (Westminster)	
2017-06-30	Stephanie Lopez (32)	Hispanic	Colorado (Englewood)	
2017-06-30	Chet Knuppel (23)	White	Colorado (Fort Collins)	
2017-06-29	Aaron Bailey (45)	Black	Indiana (Indianapolis)	Following a nighttime traffic stop and a brief car chase (which ended in Bailey's vehicle crashing), two Indianapolis Metropolitan Police Department officers fired 11 shots in the back and side of Bailey's vehicle; four struck Bailey, killing him. The officers said that the saw "Bailey reaching toward the center console, where they feared a gun may have been stored"; however, no weapon was found. State and federal prosecutors conducted investigations but decided not to prosecute the two officers. The police chief recommended that the two officers be fired for violations of department policy, but the local Civilian Police Merit Board voted, 5–2 that the officers had not committed a violation, allowing them to keep their jobs on the police force.
2017-06-29	Jose Guillermo Flores Colon (37)	Hispanic	Florida (Deltona)	
2017-06-29	Marco Cardoza (41)	Hispanic	California (Burbank)	
2017-06-29	Joel Gatu Muturi (23)	Black	Georgia (Marietta)	
2017-06-28	Rodney L. Cole (37)	Black	Tennessee (Nashville)	
2017-06-28	Samuel Alamillo	Hispanic	California (Los Angeles)	
2017-06-27	Jason Magana Herrera (35)	Hispanic	Texas (Amarillo)	
2017-06-25	Nicholas Johnston (47)	White	Arizona (Cave Creek)	
2017-06-25	Lawrence Heyward Jr. (56)	Black	South Carolina (North Charleston)	
2017-06-25	Rip S. Huntington (36)	Hispanic	New Mexico (Rowe)	
2017-06-25	George Tillman (56)	White	Nevada (Las Vegas)	
2017-06-25	Deveonte Johnson (24)	Black	Oklahoma (Oklahoma City)	
2017-06-24	Cameron Ollman (37)	White	Oregon (Florence)	
2017-06-24	Christopher Michael Murray	White	Alabama (Deer Park)	
2017-06-24	Jimmie Bevenue (47)	White	Oklahoma (Tulsa)	
2017-06-24	Giovonn Joseph-McDade (20)	Black	Washington (Kent)	Police attempted to pull Joseph-McDade over during a traffic stop. Joseph-McDade fled, eventually colliding his vehicle with a police vehicle. An officer ordered him to get out of his vehicle. Police say Joseph-McDade then gunned the engine at which point police opened fire, killing him.
2017-06-23	Jesus Ramon Deltoro (34)	Hispanic	Arizona (Phoenix)	
2017-06-22	Santino Trevino (20)	Hispanic	California (Los Angeles)	
2017-06-22	Armando Garcia-Muro (17)	Hispanic	California (Palmdale)	Los Angeles sheriff's deputies responded to a "loud music" complaint, and after one deputy reached down to touch a large pit bull, the dog bit the deputy. Two deputies opened fire, firing six shots, and a bullet ricocheted and killed Garcia-Muro. The Los Angeles County District Attorney's Office concluded that the deputies' actions were lawful and declined to bring charges. The mother of the victim filed a wrongful death suit.
2017-06-21	Daniel Francisco Valenzuela (37)	Hispanic	Oklahoma (Millerton)	
2017-06-21	Terry Williams (19)	Black	Wisconsin (Milwaukee)	
2017-06-21	Brandon D. Lukenbill (33)	White	Missouri (Nevada)	
2017-06-20	Jacob Faulkner (32)	White	Ohio (Hamilton)	
2017-06-20	Pedro Ramirez (28)	Hispanic	Nevada (Las Vegas)	
2017-06-20	Robb Stewart (50)	White	Kansas (Lehigh)	
2017-06-20	David Bryan Creson (40)	White	Tennessee (Franklin)	
2017-06-20	David Pacas (36)	Hispanic	California (South Gate)	
2017-06-19	Alton Folmar (28)	White	Texas (Dallas)	
2017-06-19	Matthew Colton Stover (21)	Native American	Alaska (Fairbanks)	
2017-06-18	Christopher Reyes (30)	Hispanic	Texas (Edinburg)	
2017-06-18	Charleena Lyles (30)	Black	Washington (Seattle)	Two Seattle police officers shot Charleena Lyles, a pregnant woman, seven times in her Northwest Seattle apartment, after she called 9-1-1 to report a burglary. Police said they fired after Lyles confronted them with a knife, but Lyles' family questioned that account. Lyles may have suffered from mental illness, having experienced a decline in her mental health leading up to the fatal encounter. Inquest proceedings began in 2019.
2017-06-18	William Brewster (64)	White	Wisconsin (Waukesha)	
2017-06-17	Joseph Paul Hogan (48)	White	South Dakota (Rapid City)	
2017-06-17	Samantha Aguilar (28)	Hispanic	California (Montebello)	
2017-06-16	Jamie Dougan (24)	White	Mississippi (Water Valley)	
2017-06-16	Robert J. Berube (41)	White	Mississippi (Water Valley)	
2017-06-16	Hector Cisneros Soria (30)	Hispanic	California (Rialto)	
2017-06-16	Nathan Banks (37)	White	California (Antioch)	
2017-06-16	Joshua Terrell Crawford (25)	Black	Alabama (Tuscaloosa)	
2017-06-16	Sergio Valdovinos (32)	Hispanic	California (Madera)	
2017-06-15	Michael Brown (40)	White	New Hampshire (Newton)	
2017-06-14	Michael Hiram Morris (54)	White	Tennessee (Somerville)	
2017-06-14	Tommy Le (20)	Asian	Washington (Burien)	Following reports of gunfire and a man with a knife, ten patrol units responded to the scene, where neighbors pointed out Le as the apparent assailant. Officers say he advanced on them with a knife. Le was in reality holding a pen. Officers deployed their tasers, which they said were ineffective. They shot Le to death, claiming he was lunging at them. Le was shot twice in the back and once in the back of the hand.
2017-06-14	James T. Hodgkinson (66)	White	Virginia (Alexandria)	Congressional baseball shooting
2017-06-13	Barry Jones (36)	White	New Hampshire (Hampton)	
2017-06-13	Chazz Brown (33)	Black	Missouri (St. Louis)	
2017-06-13	Austin M. Durham (24)	White	Illinois (Jerseyville)	
2017-06-13	Jordan Frazier (36)	Black	Louisiana (Baton Rouge)	
2017-06-12	Johnny Platas (45)	Hispanic	California (Selma)	
2017-06-12	Avery D. Metrejean (35)	Black	Louisiana (Broussard)	
2017-06-12	Eleuterio Amaya-Torres (63)	Hispanic	Texas (Plano)	
2017-06-12	John W. Bays (50)	White	Kentucky (Barbourville)	
2017-06-11	Emmett Hall (60)	White	Texas (Abilene)	
2017-06-10	Robin Blaylock (53)	White	Iowa (North English)	
2017-06-10	Theodore Brendecke (82)	White	Florida (Miami)	
2017-06-10	Isaiah Obet (25)	Native Hawaiian or Pacific Islander	Washington (Auburn)	Police responded to reports of a man with a weapon in an occupied home, later identified as Obet. When Obet fled, he attempted to carjack a vehicle. Police then opened fire, killing him.
2017-06-09	Joshua Anthony Barre (29)	Black	Oklahoma (Tulsa)	
2017-06-09	Antonio Juarez (44)	Hispanic	Illinois (Lyons)	
2017-06-08	David Thomas Jones (32)	Black	Pennsylvania (Philadelphia)	
2017-06-08	Oscar Junior (45)	Hispanic	California (Ridgecrest)	
2017-06-08	Michele Anne-Marie Rice (33)	White	California (Long Beach)	
2017-06-08	Miguel Diaz Garcia (38)	Hispanic	Texas (San Benito)	
2017-06-08	Stephen Scott Rich (48)	White	Colorado (Loveland)	
2017-06-08	Paul Eugene Mashburn Jr. (57)	White	Oklahoma (Roland)	
2017-06-07	Salvadro Alfredo Pablo Lopez (21)	Hispanic	California (Fresno)	
2017-06-07	Blaine Robert Erb (35)	White	Maryland (Dundalk)	
2017-06-07	Isaiah Hammett (21)	White	Missouri (St. Louis)	
2017-06-07	Donald Marcus Smith (75)	White	North Carolina (Sawmills)	
2017-06-07	Mark Ellis (54)	White	Maine (Orrington)	
2017-06-06	David W. Hamilton (50)	Unknown race	Washington (Vancouver)	
2017-06-06	Eric Rivera (20)	Hispanic	California (Los Angeles)	
2017-06-05	Adrian Maurice Hardeman (37)	Black	Texas (Shiner)	
2017-06-05	Charles Edgar "Eddie" Mullins (45)	White	Kentucky (Bardstown)	
2017-06-05	Quentin Case (34)	White	Florida (Lake Wales)	
2017-06-05	Zachary N. Bearheels (29)	Native American	Nebraska (Omaha)	After being asked to leave a bus in Omaha while heading to his home state of Oklahoma, Bear Heels, who had schizophrenia and bipolar disorder, was left at a gas station. His mother asked police to bring him to a crisis center. Police officers punched Bear Heels, and deployed a stun gun on him 12 times, leading to his death.
2017-06-05	John Spaulding (47)	Black	Florida (Miami)	
2017-06-04	Bruce Dawley (66)	White	California (Campo)	
2017-06-04	Juwan Lumpkin (21)	Black	Michigan (Detroit)	
2017-06-04	Jeremy A. Lindsey (27)	White	Florida (Callahan)	
2017-06-03	Donald L. Cramer (44)	White	Arizona (Avondale)	
2017-06-02	Francisco "Frank" Suarez-Maldonado (27)	Hispanic	Nevada (Las Vegas)	Las Vegas police shot and killed Suarez, stating that he had shot at officers and had told his girlfriend he wanted officers to kill him prior to the shooting.
2017-06-02	Charles D. Baker Jr. (29)	Black	Alabama (Abbeville)	
2017-06-02	Marc B. Davis (34)	Black	Mississippi (Petal)	
2017-06-02	Naway Willy (18)	Asian	Oklahoma (Tulsa)	
2017-06-02	Antonio G. Rodriguez (55)	Hispanic	Texas (Laredo)	
2017-06-02	Corsean Lewis (17)	Black	Illinois (Chicago)	
2017-06-02	Raul Gallegos (45)	Hispanic	New Mexico (Albuquerque)	
2017-06-02	Edward E. Courtenay (51)	White	Florida (Fernandina Beach)	

== See also ==
- Death in custody § United States
- Henry A. Wallace Police Crime Public Database
- List of cases of police brutality
- List of countries with annual rates and counts for killings by law enforcement officers
- List of law enforcement officers killed in the line of duty in the United States
- List of law enforcement officers convicted for an on-duty killing in the United States
- List of shootings by US immigration agents
- List of police reforms related to the George Floyd protests
- List of unarmed African Americans killed by law enforcement officers in the United States
- Lists of killings by law enforcement officers
- Police brutality in the United States
- Police misconduct § United States
- Police riot § United States
- Police use of deadly force in the United States
