= Death of Dil Bahadur Limbu =

2009 death in Hong Kong

Dil Bahadur Limbu
- Born: c. 1978; Hong Kong
- Died: 17 March 2009 (aged 31); Ho Man Tin, Hong Kong, China
- Cause of death: Fatally shot by police
- Relatives: Ram Limbu (older brother)

On 17 March 2009, Dil Bahadur Limbu, a Nepalese man, was shot to death by police constable Hui Ka-ki on a Ho Man Tin hillside in Hong Kong. He was shot two times, one of which struck him in his head and killed him, according to news reports. Police allege that Hui shot Limbu in self-defense after Limbu punched Hui and attacked him with a chair. The march caused significant protest and is viewed as an example of problems facing ethnic minorities in Hong Kong. The authorities determined that the killing was lawful. In response to the killing, the Hong Kong police increased its outreach to ethnic minorities.
