= List of countries with annual rates and counts for killings by law enforcement officers =

This is a list of countries with annual rates and counts for killings by law enforcement officers.

== List ==
List of countries with annual rates and counts for killings by law enforcement officers. With breakdown by police, etc..
Location	Region	Killings	Police	Military	Intel agencies	Other	Population	Rate per 10 million	Year listed	Notes	Source
Venezuela	Americas	5,286					28,887,118	1829.9	2019		
El Salvador	Americas	1087					6,380,000	1703.8	2017		
Syria	Asia	1,497					18,270,000	819	2019	In the context of the Syrian civil war	
Philippines	Asia	6,069+					109,048,269	556.5	2016-2021	These are just the "Drug personalities who died in anti-drug operations" alone. Actual number is much higher.	
Nicaragua	Americas	325+					6,218,000	522.7	2018	Up to 535	
Jamaica	Americas	137	133	4	0	0	2,898,000	472.7	2018		
Trinidad and Tobago	Americas	46	46	0	0	0	1,354,000	339.7	2014		
Brazil	Americas	6,602					210,147,125	313.99	2025		
Bahamas	Americas	11	11	0	0	0	399,285	275.7	2018		
Saint Vincent and the Grenadines	Americas	2	2	0	0	0	110,211	181.8	2018		
Afghanistan	Asia	606	49	267	234	56	35,530,000	170.5	2018		
Guyana	Americas	12+	12	0	0	0	787,076	152.5	2018		
Dominican Republic	Americas	142	134	5	0	3	10,770,000	131.8	2017		
South Africa	Africa	436					56,720,000	76.9	2017/8		
Central African Republic	Africa	30+	30+				4,659,000	64.4	2015/6	18 documented executions with credible information about 12 other cases	
Lesotho	Africa	19					2,233,000	63.8	2017/8	Data from 16 months, rate divided accordingly.	
Burkina Faso	Africa	116					19,190,000	60.4	2018/9	From September 2018 to February 2019	
Saint Lucia	Americas	1	1	0	0	0	178,844	56.2	2019		
Democratic Republic of the Congo	Africa	389					81,340,000	47.8	2018		
Iraq	Asia	176+					39,309,783	45.1	2019		
Nigeria	Africa	841					190,900,000	44.0	2018		
Kenya	Africa	222					50,950,879	43.5	2018		
Honduras	Americas	37					9,158,345	40.4	2019		
Iran	Asia	304+					83,372,584	36.6	2019	Low estimate, real figure is likely to be higher	
Burundi	Africa	39	10	1	2	26	10,860,000	35.9	2018	Data from 8 months, rate multiplied accordingly.	
Uruguay	Americas	67					3,469,551	35.1	2014-2019	Data for 66 months, rate adjusted accordingly.	
Angola	Africa	100+					28,810,000	34.7	2016	Data from capital city only.	
Colombia	Americas	169	97	72	0	0	49,070,000	34.1	2017		
United States	Americas	1,096	1,096				331,449,281	33.1	2022	Data compiled by The Washington Post. See also: List of killings by law enforcement officers in the United States	
Mali	Africa	60+					18,540,000	32.3	2018		
Sudan	Africa	138+					43,110,000	32.1	2019		
Rwanda	Africa	37+					11,920,000	31.0	2016/7		
Mexico	Americas	371	145	170	0	56	124,041,731	30.0	2017		
Bangladesh	Asia	466					164,700,000	28.3	2018		
Pakistan	Asia	495					197,000,000	25.2	2017		
Eswatini	Africa	3+					1,357,161	22.1	2019		
Argentina	Americas	95					44,270,000	21.6	2019		
Egypt	Africa	212					97,550,000	21.2	2018	Counted using graph	
Malta	Europe	1	0	1	0	0	493,559	20.0	2019		
Canada	Americas	69					37,060,000	18.6	2022	See also: List of killings by law enforcement officers in Canada	
Luxembourg	Europe	1	1	0	0	0	590,321	16.9	2018		
India	Asia	1,731	125			1606	1,380,000,000	12.54	2019	"Other" lists killings while in judicial custody. Official numbers are considerably lower. Official 2018 statistics show only 46 deaths in police custody and 24 deaths of people in police/judicial remand and an additional 21 civilian killed during police operations for a total of 91 nationally. See Table 16A and 16B.4 of Official Govt. of India publication: Crime in India 2018	
Morocco	Africa	3	-	-	-	3	37,493,183	0.8	2025	-	
Australia	Oceania	16	0	0	0	0	24,600,000	6.5	2019-2020		
France	Europe	37	37				67,392,000	5.5	2021		
Belgium	Europe	5	5				11,589,623	4.3	2021		
Indonesia	Asia	77+					264,000,000	2.9	2018	As of August 17, 2018	
Netherlands	Europe	14	14	0	0	0	17,440,000	7.8	2016-2024	Controle Alt Delete (CAD) investigates how many people die under the responsibility of law enforcement since 2016. In 2016 CAD registered 10 victims, also 10 in 2017, 9 in 2018, 12 in 2019, 18 in 2020, 13 in 2021, 23 victims in 2022, 8 victims in 2023 and 17 victims in 2024. On average there were 14 fatal incidents per year in the period 2016-2024.	
New Zealand	Oceania	1	1	0	0	0	4,794,000	2.1	2018	One additional death ruled inconclusive	
Norway	Europe	1	1	0	0	0	5,258,000	1.9	2016		
Finland	Europe	1	1	0	0	0	5,503,000	1.8	2018		
Nepal	Asia	5+	5	0	0	0	29,300,000	1.7	2019		
Germany	Europe	11	11	0	0	0	82,887,000	1.3	2018	See also: List of killings by law enforcement officers in Germany	
Hong Kong	Asia	1	1	0	0	0	7,392,000	1.3	2019	See also: List of killings by law enforcement officers in China	
Portugal	Europe	1	1	0	0	0	10,290,000	1.0	2018		
Sweden	Europe	1	1	0	0	0	10,327,589	1.0	2019		
Czechia	Europe	1	1	-	-	-	10,538,275	1.0	2014		
Taiwan	Asia	2	2	0	0	0	23,580,000	0.8	2018		
United Kingdom	Europe	3	3	0	0	0	66,040,229	0.5	2019	Fatal shootings. See also: List of killings by law enforcement officers in the United Kingdom	
Poland	Europe	2	2	0	0	0	38,433,600	0.5	2020	See also: List of killings by law enforcement officers in Poland	
Japan	Asia	2	2	0	0	0	127,185,332	0.2	2018		
Denmark	Europe	0	0	0	0	0	5,873,420	0	2022		
Iceland	Europe	0	0	0	0	0	350,000	0	2016	2013 was the only year in which police killed anybody	
Switzerland	Europe	0	-	-	-	-	8,420,000	0	2018		
Croatia	Europe	0	-	-	-	-	3,997,461	0	2022	-	

== Historical data ==
=== 2020s ===
Country	2020	2021	2022	2023	2024	2025
Argentina						
Australia	16					
Bangladesh						
Belgium		5	3			
Brazil						
Burundi						
Canada	52	57	69			
Colombia						
Denmark	2	0	0			
Dominican Republic						
Finland	0	1	0	0	1	2
France	32	37				
Germany	9	1				
Iceland						
Jamaica						
Japan				1 (as of 13 January)		
Kenya						
Netherlands	18	13	23	9	17	
New Zealand						
Norway						
Poland	3	1				
Portugal						
South Africa						
Sweden						
United Kingdom	5	2				
United States	1,021	1,055	1,096	1,232+		
Uruguay						
Venezuela						
Morocco						3

=== 2010s ===
Country	2010	2011	2012	2013	2014	2015	2016	2017	2018	2019
Argentina	109	105	121	116	154	125	113	107	110	95
Australia	3	6	4	1	3	10	5	4	8	9
Bangladesh				208	154	192	195	162	466	204
Belgium	3	1	2	2	7	2	2	2	3	2
Brazil							4,224	5,144	6,160	5,804
Burundi							265	59	39	
Canada	29	29	23	24	24	36	40	34	32	34
Colombia							236	163	169	
Czechia	2	2	2	1	1	0	3	0	0	0
Denmark	1	0	0	1	2	1	2	0	0	0
Dominican Republic	244	269			209	193	168	142		
Finland	1	0	0	0	0	1	3	0	1	1
France	10	20	21	15	24	27	24	36	28	28
Germany	8	6	8	8	7	10	11	14	11	17
Iceland	0	0	0	1	0	0	0			
Jamaica	357	210	219	258	115	101	111	168	137	
Kenya						143	205	256	222	58
Netherlands	2	2	5	5	12	6	10	10	9	13
New Zealand	0	2	0	2	0	3	3	3	1	
Norway	0	0	0	0	0	1	1			
Poland	2	1	0	0	2	1	3	3	2	2
Portugal	5	1	3	2	0	0	4	2	1	
South Africa						423	400	394	436	
Sweden	0	1	0	4	3	2	3	1	6	1
United Kingdom	1	2	1	0	1	3	4	6	1	3
United States	1,276	1,350	1,649	1,629	1,486	1,356	1,356	1,767	1,603	1,536
Uruguay									17	22
Venezuela							5,995	4,998	5,287	5,286

=== 2000s ===
Country	2000	2001	2002	2003	2004	2005	2006	2007	2008	2009
Belgium	2	14	13	23	20	22	22	0	2	2
Finland	1	0	0	0	0	0	0	0	0	1

=== 1990s ===
Country	1996	1997	1998	1999
Belgium	2	1	2	2

== See also ==
- Crime statistics
- Lists of killings by law enforcement officers
- Police brutality
- Police firearm use by country
- Police use of deadly force in the United States
