= List of killings by law enforcement officers in Poland =

This is a list of people killed by non-military law enforcement officers in Poland, both on duty and off, and regardless of reason or method. Inclusion in the lists implies neither wrongdoing nor justification on the part of the person killed or the officer involved; the listing merely documents the occurrence of a death.

== Since 1990 ==
Date	Name (age) of deceased	Place	Voivodeship	Description
2025-07-31	N.N. (45)	Sosnowiec	Silesian Voivodeship	Police responded to reports of a man with a machete damaging parked cars and a bus. He was shot five times, and died in hospital. It was later revealed that he was actually holding a metal pipe.
2024-11-23	N.N. (35)	Warsaw	Masovian Voivodeship	While responding to a report of an aggressive man wielding a machete, a junior officer shot his colleague, who died in hospital.
2021-12-16	Tomasz N.	Wydminy	Warmian–Masurian Voivodeship	Police officer Mateusz C. shot a drunk man resisting arrest at very close range, killing him. Another officer was injured after the bullet passed through the man's body and struck her wrist. Mateusz C. was fired and given a one-year suspended prison sentence.
2021-04-19	Łukasz P. (36)	Ruda Śląska	Silesian Voivodeship	Police officers shot dead man after he rammed three police cars and aimed at the officers with a gun.
2020-12-22	N.N. (32)	Płock	Masovian Voivodeship	Police officers used tear gas against an aggressively behaving driver, who later died in a hospital.
2020-06-27	Dariusz Nawara (28)	Kościelisko	Lesser Poland Voivodeship	Police officer shot dead man accused of robbery.
2020-06-18	N.N. (31)	Żyrardów	Masovian Voivodeship	Police officer shot dead woman who attacked him with knife after stabbing a man.
2019-11-14	Adam Czerniejewski (21)	Konin	Greater Poland Voivodeship	Police officer shot dead man who tried to escape from identity check. He was armed with scissors.
2019-07-26	N.N. (30)	Lipsko	Masovian Voivodeship	Police officer shot and killed man who attacked him with knife.
2018-07-21	N.N.	Olsztyn	Warmian–Masurian Voivodeship	Police officer shot seven times drunk man who tried to escape from police. He died the next day in hospital. The officer was criminally charged.
2018-05-23	N.N. (43)	Opole	Opole Voivodeship	Police officer shot dead man armed with pneumatic gun who was vandalizing a police car.
2017-12-15	Adrian Z.	Kraków	Lesser Poland Voivodeship	Counter-terrorism officer fatally shot a gangster during arrest
2017-12-02	N.N. (42)	Wisznia Mała	Lower Silesian Voivodeship	Police officers shot dead man who opened machine gun fire on them, which killed an officer and wounded three others.
2017-06-21	N.N	Milicz	Lower Silesian Voivodeship	Two men broke into a gas station and stole cigarettes in Dobrzyca, Greater Poland Voivodeship. They then crossed the border into Lower Silesian Voivodeship while being pursued on foot by police through a forest. One of the thieves shot a police officer in the neck; the shooter was then shot in the leg and died of his wounds at the scene.
2016-12-31	Cezary S.	Żychlin	Łódź Voivodeship	Police officer Łukasz M. killed a trader of cigarettes and alcohol Cezary S. with six gunshots, to whom he owed 20,000 PLN
2016-08-12	Cezary S.	Szczecin	West Pomeranian Voivodeship	Police officer shot dead man who tried to escape from road check. He was sentenced to one and a half years in prison in 2019
2016-05-15	Igor Stachowiak (26)	Wrocław	Lower Silesian Voivodeship	Igor Stachowiak was tased multiple times by four police officers, which may have caused his death. The officers were sentenced to from 2 to 2.5 years in prison in 2019
2015-12-21	N.N.	Gdynia	Pomeranian Voivodeship	A man was shot after he opened fire on police officers that entered his apartment while carrying out an arrest warrant. He was wanted in connection to a murder.
2015-05-02	Dawid D. (27)	Knurów	Silesian Voivodeship	Pseudo-fan died after being shot with rubber bullet during riots after football match. Police officer who killed him was later cleared of charges
2014-12-15	N.N.	Sosnowiec	Silesian Voivodeship	Police officer shot dead man who robbed the bank
2014-07-14	N.N. (56)	Ruda Śląska	Silesian Voivodeship	Police officers shot an aggressively behaving psychiatric hospital patient in the thigh and torso. He died later on the operating table
2011-01-15	Andrzej Swoszowski (28)	Tuchów	Lesser Poland Voivodeship	Police officers opened fire at a stolen car
2010-10-10	N.N. (69)	Żar	Silesian Voivodeship,	Police officers shot dead man who opened fire on them
2010-05-24	Maxwell Itoya	Warsaw	Masovian Voivodeship	Maxwell Itoya died after being shot when trying to talk to the policeman
2009-10-16	Krzysztof K.	Duszniki	Greater Poland Voivodeship	Man died after shootout with police
2009-06-13	Grzegorz P.	Borucza	Masovian Voivodeship	Police officer shot dead a mentally ill man who attacked him with a knife. He was later cleared of charges.
2006-07-27	Marcin K. (21)	Chodel	Lublin Voivodeship	Motorcyclist was shot ten times after failed to stop for a security check. He died from spine wounds
2004-10-09	N.N.	Kutno	Łódź Voivodeship	Police officers shot dead gangster during arrest
2004-05-08	Monika Kelm (23)	Łódź	Łódź Voivodeship	Police shot dead two people during riots
2004-05-08	Damian Tybura (19)	Łódź	Łódź Voivodeship	Police shot dead two people during riots
2004-04-29	Łukasz T. (19)	Poznań	Greater Poland Voivodeship	Police officers opened fire at car which failed to stop for a security check.
2003-06-13	Józef Ł.	Zielona Góra	Lubusz Voivodeship	Police officers shot dead gangster who was trying to steal his gun
2003-01-21	Piotr R.	Warsaw	Masovian Voivodeship	Two gangsters were killed in shootout with police.
2003-01-21	Krzysztof M.	Warsaw	Masovian Voivodeship	Two gangsters were killed in shootout with police.
2002-08-06	N.N. (37)	Wola Podłężna	Greater Poland Voivodeship	Man was killed in shootout with police after he shot them with shotgun
2002-06-22	N.N.	Tomaszów Lubelski	Lublin Voivodeship	Man was killed in shootout with police after trying to rob bureau de change with gas weapon
2001-01-28	Sierhij K.	Świdnik	Lublin Voivodeship	He was shot dead after he didn't stop for security check
2000-06-23	N.N.	Głogów	Lower Silesian Voivodeship	Police officers shot dead man who opened fire on them
2000-03-14	Ryszard Karczewski	Warsaw	Masovian Voivodeship	Police officer mistakenly shot and killed a vet while trying to catch tiger that escaped from a circus.
2000-01-08	Krzysztof P. (26)	Warsaw	Masovian Voivodeship	Police officers shot dead car thief
1999-10-15	Valeri Bermes (34)	Kraków	Lesser Poland Voivodeship	Anti-terrorist units killed gangster after he opened fire on them
1999-06-16	Michał Filipek (23)	Sosnowiec	Silesian Voivodeship	He was killed by four police officers who have beaten him with batons. Three of them were later sentenced to years in prison.
1998-01-10	Przemysław Czaja (13)	Słupsk	Słupsk Voivodeship (now part of Pomeranian Voivodeship)	During the 1998 Słupsk street riots, police officer caught up to a member of the group crossing the street on red light, the 13-year-old Przemysław Czaja, and repeatedly hit his head and neck using his baton. At 8:20 p.m. the boy died.
1997-03-09	Robert R. (25)	Warsaw	Warsaw Voivodeship (now part of Masovian Voivodeship)	Police officer was trying to catch a criminal. He shot his firearm into the air which alarmed men who approached him while carrying baseball bats. He shot two of them dead and injured third. In 1999 he was sentenced for years in prison, however he was pardoned by president Aleksander Kwaśniewski in 2002.
1997-03-09	Stanisław Ż. (54)	Warsaw	Warsaw Voivodeship (now part of Masovian Voivodeship)	Police officer was trying to catch a criminal. He shot his firearm into the air which alarmed men who approached him while carrying baseball bats. He shot two of them dead and injured third. In 1999 he was sentenced for years in prison, however he was pardoned by president Aleksander Kwaśniewski in 2002.
1997-01-06	Robert J. (19)	Łomazy	Biała Podlaska Voivodeship (now part of Lublin Voivodeship)	Police officer shot dead man during interrogation at the police station. He was later sentenced for 15 years in prison

== 1945–1990 ==
Date	Name (age) of deceased	Description
1984-10-19	Jerzy Popiełuszko (37)	He was beaten to death by three Security Police officers.
1982-10-13	Bogdan Włosik (20)	Killed by an officer of the Security Service during a steelworkers' demonstration
1981-12-17	Antoni Browarczyk (20)	Shot in the head by a Milicja Obywatelska officer
1981-12-16	Andrzej Pełka (19)	Striking miners killed during the Pacification of the Wujek mine.
1981-12-16	Zenon Zając (31)	Striking miners killed during the Pacification of the Wujek mine.
1981-12-16	Zbigniew Wilk (30)	Striking miners killed during the Pacification of the Wujek mine.
1981-12-16	Bogusław Kopczak (28)	Striking miners killed during the Pacification of the Wujek mine.
1981-12-16	Ryszard Józef Gzik (35)	Striking miners killed during the Pacification of the Wujek mine.
1981-12-16	Józef Krzysztof Giza (24)	Striking miners killed during the Pacification of the Wujek mine.
1981-12-16	Joachim Józef Gnida (28)	Striking miners killed during the Pacification of the Wujek mine.
1981-12-16	Józef Czekalski (48)	Striking miners killed during the Pacification of the Wujek mine.
1981-12-16	Jan Stawisiński (21)	Striking miners killed during the Pacification of the Wujek mine.
1970-12	Jerzy Matelski	Killed during the December 1970 protests in Poland
1970-12	Józef Widerlik	Killed during the December 1970 protests in Poland
1970-12	Kazimierz Stojecki	Killed during the December 1970 protests in Poland
1970-12	Andrzej Peszyński	Killed during the December 1970 protests in Poland
1970-12	Stefan Mosiewicz	Killed during the December 1970 protests in Poland
1970-12	Kazimierz Zastawny	Killed during the December 1970 protests in Poland
1970-12	Bogdan Sypka	Killed during the December 1970 protests in Poland
1970-12	Zygmunt Polito	Killed during the December 1970 protests in Poland
1970-12	Zygmunt Gliniecki	Killed during the December 1970 protests in Poland
1970-12	Jerzy Kuchcik	Killed during the December 1970 protests in Poland
1970-12	Waldemar Zajczenko	Killed during the December 1970 protests in Poland
1970-12	Brunon Drywa	Killed during the December 1970 protests in Poland
1970-12	Stanisław Sieradzan	Killed during the December 1970 protests in Poland
1970-12	Zbigniew Godlewski	Killed during the December 1970 protests in Poland
1970-12	Ludwik Piernicki	Killed during the December 1970 protests in Poland
1970-12	Jan Kałużny	Killed during the December 1970 protests in Poland
1970-12	Zbigniew Wycichowski	Killed during the December 1970 protests in Poland
1970-12	Józef Pawiowski	Killed during the December 1970 protests in Poland
1970-12	Jan Polechoński	Killed during the December 1970 protests in Poland
1970-12	Zbigniew Nastały	Killed during the December 1970 protests in Poland
1970-12	Marian Wójcik	Killed during the December 1970 protests in Poland
1970-12	Stanisław Lewandowski	Killed during the December 1970 protests in Poland
1970-12	Janusz Żebrowski	Killed during the December 1970 protests in Poland
1970-12	Jerzy Skonieczka	Killed during the December 1970 protests in Poland
1970-12	Apolinary Formela	Killed during the December 1970 protests in Poland
1970-12-18	Tadeusz Marian Sawicz (22)	Shot in the head by a police officer while walking out of a milk bar
1970-12-15	Waldemar Rebinin (26)	Killed during the Polish protests of 1970
1951-05-10	Józef Padewski (57)	He was tortured to death by officers of the Ministry of Public Security of Poland
1947-05-04	Edward Cytrian	Police officer shot dead boy in Mały Płock during an event.

== 1918–1939 ==
Date	Name (age) of deceased	Description
1937	114 individuals	According to speech of Prime Minister in Sejm in 1937
1936	149 individuals	157 killed by police in 1936 totally
1936-03-23	Józef Cieślik	Killed in the Semperit strike
1936-03-23	Jan Jędrygas	Killed in the Semperit strike
1936-03-23	Janina Krasicka	Killed in the Semperit strike
1936-03-23	Andrzej Proc	Killed in the Semperit strike
1936-03-23	Jan Szwed	Killed in the Semperit strike
1936-03-23	Jan Szybiak	Killed in the Semperit strike
1936-03-23	Piotr Wrona	Killed in the Semperit strike
1936-03-23	Antoni Żłobiński	Killed in the Semperit strike
1935	143 individuals	
1934	118 individuals	
1933	145 individuals	
1932	141 individuals	
1921-08-19	Stefan Cyburski (22)	Killed during the 1921 Rawicz riots
1921-08-19	Władysław Dąbrowicz (18)	Killed during the 1921 Rawicz riots
1921-08-19	Franciszek Robaszyński (23)	Killed during the 1921 Rawicz riots
1921-08-19	Wincenty Szukalski (37)	Killed during the 1921 Rawicz riots
1921-08-19	Kazimierz Szwarc (17)	Killed during the 1921 Rawicz riots
1921-08-19	Jan Tatarek (22)	Killed during the 1921 Rawicz riots
1921-08-19	Jan Tyca (26)	Killed during the 1921 Rawicz riots
1920-04-26	Kazimierz Bogdaszewski	Killed during 1920 Posen strike
1920-04-26	Józef Dereziński	Killed during 1920 Posen strike
1920-04-26	Stefan Domagała	Killed during 1920 Posen strike
1920-04-26	Michał Dziembalski	Killed during 1920 Posen strike
1920-04-26	Franciszek Krzyśko	Killed during 1920 Posen strike
1920-04-26	Jan Mieloch	Killed during 1920 Posen strike
1920-04-26	Marcin Ratajczak	Killed during 1920 Posen strike
1920-04-26	Kazimierz Szkudlarek	Killed during 1920 Posen strike
1920-04-26	Stanisław Tukaj	Killed during 1920 Posen strike

== See also ==
- Lists of killings by law enforcement officers
