= List of killings by law enforcement officers in Germany =

Listed below are people killed by non-military law enforcement officers in Germany, whether or not in the line of duty, irrespective of reason or method. Included, too, are cases where individuals died in police custody due to applied techniques. Inclusion in the list implies neither wrongdoing nor justification on the part of the person killed or the officer involved. The listing simply documents occurrences of deaths and is not complete.

== Statistics ==
year	number killed by use of firearms (official statistics)	number killed by any means (counted)	number of shots fired on persons
1929	at least 46		
1930	at least 29	34	
1931	at least 34		
1952	at least 31 (e.g., Philipp Müller)		
1958	at least 5		
1963	at least 4 (North Rhine-Westphalia and Hesse only)		
1964	at least 2 (NRW and Hesse only)		
1965	at least 6 (NRW and Hesse only)		
1966	at least 6 (Bavaria, Bremen, Hamburg, NRW and Hesse only)		
1967	at least 5 (Benno Ohnesorg, otherwise Bavaria, Bremen, Hamburg, NRW and Hesse only)		
1968	at least 10 (Bavaria, Bremen, Hamburg, NRW and Hesse only)		
1969	at least 6 (Bavaria, Bremen, Hamburg, NRW and Hesse only)		
1970	at least 11 (Bavaria, Bremen, Hamburg, NRW and Hesse only)		
1971	at least 8 (e.g. Petra Schelm, Georg von Rauch)		
1972	at least 4 (e.g. Tommy Weisbecker, Ian McLeod, Richard Epple, Theo Duifhus)		
1973	at least 13 (e.g. Erich Dobhardt)		
1974	10 (e.g. Günter Jendrian)		
1975	15 (e.g. Werner Sauber)		
1976	8		141
1977	17 (e.g. Helmut Schlaudraff)		160
1978	8 (e.g. Willi-Peter Stoll, Michael Knoll)		111
1979	11		104
1980	16 (e.g. Manfred Perder)		111
1981	17		93
1982	11		125
1983	24 (e.g. Jürgen Bergbauer)		53
1984	6		159
1985	10		203
1986	12		169
1987	7		165
1988	9		170
1989	10		161
1990	10		162
1991	9		136
1992	12		150
1993	16		123
1994	11 (including Halim Dener)		118
1995	21		137
1996	11		95
1997	13		68
1998	8		70
1999	19		61
2000	6		52
2001	8		68
2002	7		42
2003	3		44
2004	9		63
2005	5		37
2006	6		At least 27
2007	12		46
2008	10		37
2009	6		57
2010	8		40
2011	6		36 (+109)
2012	8		38
2013	8		42
2014	7		51
2015	11	13	41
2016	13		52
2017	16		76
2018	11		58
2019	15	19	62
2020	15	20	75
2021	8	15	51
2022	11 (e.g. Mouhamed Dramé)	18	60
2023	10	14	66
2024	22		75
2025	17 (e.g. Lorenz A.)		115
2026	8		
Sum	556 minimum		2642

Figures before 1978 can not be compared directly to later numbers. A list of police killings was first compiled 1997; owing to a legal 20-year document retention limit, some files may have been destroyed. Additionally, the numbers here do not include suicides.

== See also ==
- Lists of killings by law enforcement officers
- Use of firearms by police in Germany
