= Deng Zhengjia =

Deng Zhengjia (Chinese: 邓正加) was a Chinese fruit vendor who was killed in a confrontation with urban management officials on 17 July 2013. Deng, 56, was selling watermelons with his wife in Linwu, Hunan Province, when several officials (known as "chengguan") reportedly confiscated some of their fruits and asked them to relocate to an area approved for street vending. The couple complied, and approximately 50 minutes later the chengguan officers returned. Witnesses said the officials struck Deng with a weight from his scale, and Linwu police said that Deng "unexpectedly fell to the ground and died". According to witnesses on the scene, the officers continue to kick Deng after he fell, and refused to call emergency services.

When authorities later attempted to remove the body, villagers stood in their way, capturing images in the process. That evening, hundreds of unarmed protesters clashed with riot police. Photos of bloodied protesters were widely shared on Chinese microblogs and social media platforms, where news of Deng's death was met with outrage. One netizen cited by the South China Morning Post compared Deng's death to the case of Mohamed Bouazizi, the Tunisian vegetable vendor whose cart was seized by police in 2010. Bouazizi responded by self-immolating, and his death catalyzed the Arab Spring.

Following a public outcry, authorities announced they would award Deng's family ¥879,000 RMB (~US$123,000) in compensation.

The death drew considerable attention in the domestic media, and prompted heightened criticism against chengguan urban management officials. The chengguan system was established in 1997, and operates separately from the conventional police forces with minimal oversight. Accounts of violence perpetrated by chengguan officers are widespread; between 2010 and 2012, Chinese media reported on over 150 violent encounters involving the chengguan forces.
