= Wei Wenhua =

Chinese businessman (1967–2008)

- Born: January 3, 1967; China
- Died: January 7, 2008 (aged 41); Wanba, Tianmen, Hubei
- Cause of death: Beaten to death by law enforcement for documenting law enforcement
- Occupation: Construction manager

Wei Wenhua (simplified Chinese: 魏文华; traditional Chinese: 魏文華; pinyin: Wèi Wénhuá; January 3, 1967 – January 7, 2008) was the general manager of a construction company, Shuli Architectural Engineering. He was beaten to death in Wanba, Tianmen, Hubei, after attempting to film Chinese authorities clashing with villagers.

== Death ==
The conflict which Wei attempted to film centered on a garbage dump in the village that the Chinese government was using, which the village government feared to be threatening to the inhabitants' lives.

The Chinese media reported that Wei was beaten by a group of thirty or more Chengguan (urban management officers) when he attempted to photograph the villagers protesting (by attempting to prevent more garbage being dumped) with a mobile phone (it is not currently known what Wei was attempting to use the photographs for). He was beaten inside his car for five minutes and declared dead at a local hospital soon after.

== Response to death ==
Qi Zhengjun, secretary-general of the city's government and commander of the municipal force, was fired from his position after the incident, following public outrage and government investigation into Wei's death. Twenty-four Chengguan members, as well as over one hundred other government personnel, were also questioned, and four people were detained.

According to Chen Junling, Wei's brother-in-law, a protest outside Tianmen's city hall the day after Wei's death comprised thousands of people.

== See also ==
- Internet censorship in the People's Republic of China
- Politics of the People's Republic of China
- Citizen journalism
- Citizen media
