= Chengguan (agency) =

Administrative practice of city-level local governments in China

Urban Management and Law Enforcement 城市管理执法
- Patch of the Chengguan

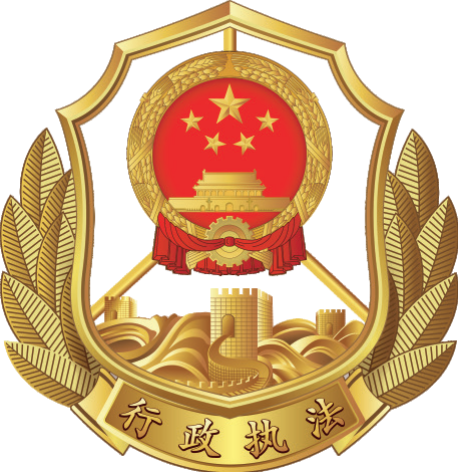
- Cap insignia of the Chengguan

- Badge of the Chengguan

Jurisdictional structure
- Operations jurisdiction: China

Urban Management and Law Enforcement
- Simplified Chinese: 城市管理执法
- Traditional Chinese: 城市管理執法
- Literal meaning: Urban Management and Law Enforcement
Transcriptions
Standard Mandarin
- Hanyu Pinyin: ChéngShì Guǎnlǐ Xíngzhèng Zhífǎ

Alternative Chinese name
- Chinese: 城管
- Literal meaning: Urban Management
Transcriptions
Standard Mandarin
- Hanyu Pinyin: chéngguǎn

Chengguan (城管; 'Urban management', short for 城市管理执法; 'Urban Management and Law Enforcement') is an administrative practice of city-level local governments in the People's Republic of China to oversee and manage city appearance and public environments according to the region's bylaws. Chengguan are non-sworn civil agencies and are not entitled police powers.

== Duties ==
Although varied by region, the responsibilities of Chengguan are usually to maintain urban management order, sanitary environment and city appearance, and carry out urban management by law enforcement, environmental protection supervision and other work, according to government sources.

According to an order from the Ministry of Housing and Urban-Rural Development in 2017, the scope of administrative penalties for urban management enforcement has been strictly limited to those specified in the laws, regulations, and rules related to the housing and urban-rural construction sector, as well as the administrative penalties related to environmental protection management, business administration, traffic management, water affairs management, and areas of food and drug supervision that pertain to urban management.

== Criticism ==
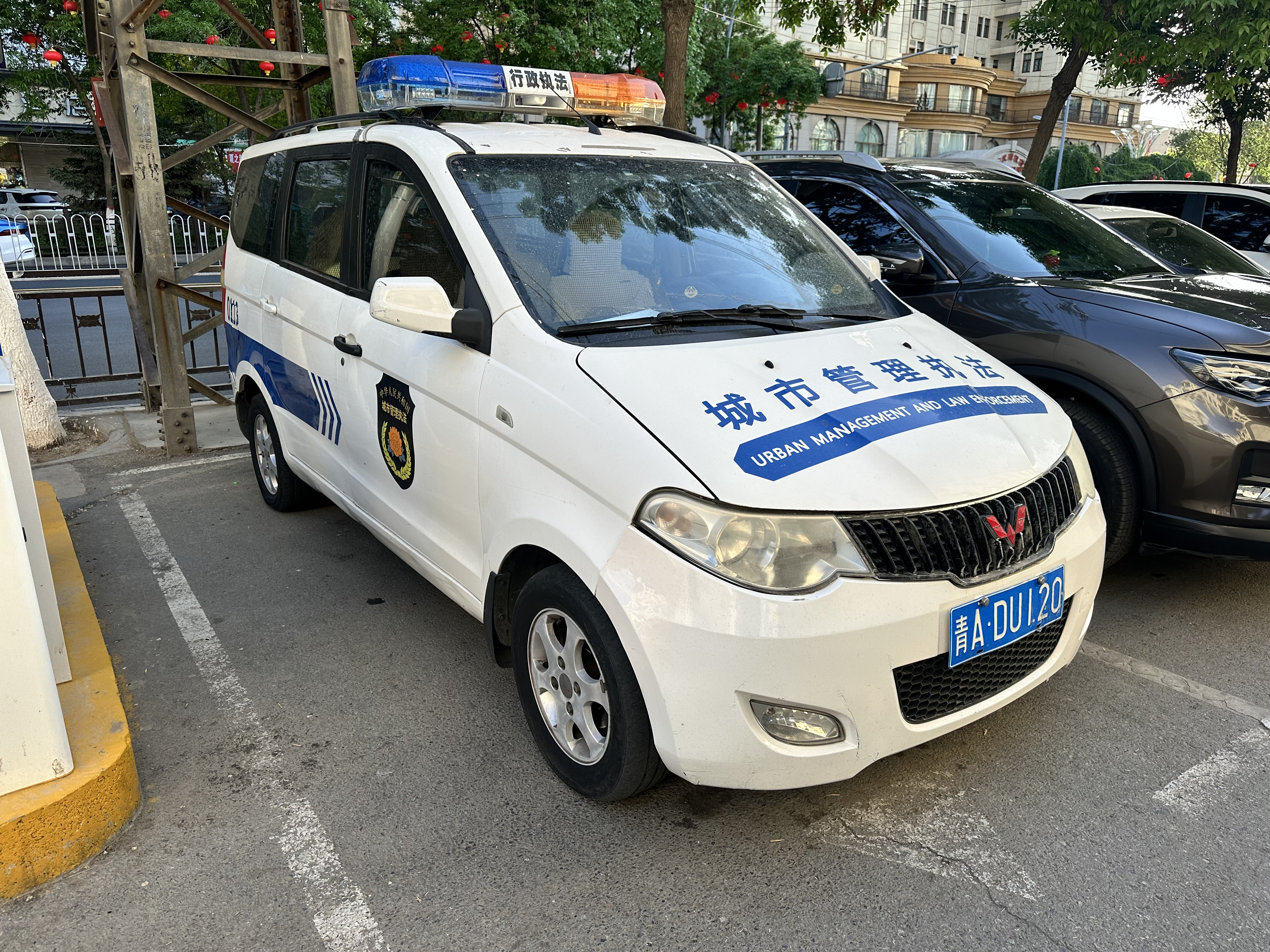
Chengguan vehicle in Xining

Chengguan are responsible for cracking down on unlicensed street vendors. According to the BBC, "Ever since the agency came into existence 10 years ago, there have been repeated criticism of them using excessive force. This de facto para-police bureau, equipped with steel helmets and stab-proof vests, is often used by local officials as trouble shooters". Chengguan often also clash with standard police who respond to Chengguan brutality reports.

In general the Chengguan serve as a civil agency employed by cities across China "to tackle low-level illegal behaviors". The public widely dislike the Chengguan due to their abuses of power, as highlighted in their involvement in several high-profile cases.

A 2012 report by Human Rights Watch documents Chengguan abuses, "including assaults on suspected administrative law violators, some of which lead to serious injury or death, illegal detention, and unlawful forceful confiscation of property".

== Incidents ==
In 2008, nationwide calls to abolish the unit followed the death of Wei Wenhua, the manager of a construction company who was beaten to death in Tianmen City, Hubei province in January 2008 for filming the actions of the Chengguan in a local dispute over rubbish dumping.

On November 3, 2011, while responding to a call of Chengguan agents committing acts of abuse, Suiping County Public Security Bureau police officer Zhang Ka was assaulted by 20 Chengguan agents after which he was kidnapped by the Chengguan agents and brought to the local police station for "Negotiations". 16 Chengguan were arrested with 3 being charged with assault of a government employee.

In 2013, a watermelon seller, Deng Zhengjia, was reported to have been beaten to death with his own scales by Chengguan. His body was protected by people on the street to prevent authorities from seizing it and to "preserve evidence." Violence ensued. Prominent microbloggers have called for the end to what has been termed a "thuggish" organization.

On July 23, 2013, Xining Municipal PSB Chengbei Division police officer Ren Jie, probationary officer Zhou Jiacai and a third probationary officer who responded to an emergency call reporting Chengguan brutality were beat up by 30 Chengguan agents and demolition workers, with Ren's bodycam and Type 64 pistol being stolen by the attackers.

In April 2014, a man filming the Chengguan abusing a female street vendor was brutally beaten with a hammer until he was vomiting blood. He was pronounced dead on the way to the hospital. The five Chengguan officers were severely beaten, and four confirmed dead later, with pictures posted on Sina Weibo.

=== 2018 Shangqiu clashes ===
On April 8, 2018, in Shangqiu, eight Public Security Bureau officers were injured in clashes with 100 Chengguan who were attempting to remove people from their place of residence which was located in an area that was slated for redevelopment. The incident involved Chengguan who were caught on camera throwing stones at people's homes and required the deployment of tear gas by the local SWAT detachment. A subsequent investigation resulted in the arrest of three Chengguan agents.

== In popular culture ==
As a result of its notorious reputation, the Chengguan has become a popular target of jokes and internet memes.

Time magazine reported that beatings by Chengguan employees have become such commonplace news that "'Chengguan' has even taken on an alternate meaning in Chinese. 'Don't be too Chengguan' is an appeal not to bully or terrorize". "The Chengguan is coming!", a phrase often shouted out by illegal street vendors to warn others to run away in case of a Chengguan inspection, has become a famous Chinese Internet punch line.

There are also satirical jokes of the Chengguan actually being China's secret strategic reserves, the "fifth branch of the PLA", because of their capability to cause "mass destruction". Punch lines such as "Give me 300 Chengguan, I will conquer..." and "China has pledged not to be the first to use Chengguan at any time or under any circumstances in order to keep world peace and stability" have gone viral among Chinese netizens.

== Administrative structure ==
The bureau is usually structured along two offices and six departments.

- Administrative Office
- Comprehensive Management Department
- City Appearance Management Department
- Enforcement Management Department
- Legal Department
- Information Department
- Outdoor Advertisement Management Department
- Supervision Office

== See also ==
- Bylaw enforcement officer
- Ministry of Public Security (China)
- Law enforcement agency
- Law enforcement in China
