= Killing of John Geer =

2013 police shooting in Springfield, Virginia

Shooting of John Geer
- Date: August 29, 2013
- Time: 2:52-3:34 p.m.
- Location: Pebble Brook Court, Springfield, Virginia, U.S.
- Deaths: John Geer
- Accused: Adam Torres
- Charges: Second degree murder
- Convictions: Involuntary manslaughter
- Litigation: Geer's daughters filed a lawsuit against Fairfax County; received $3 million settlement

John Geer, a 46-year-old man, was killed on August 29, 2013, in the Pohick Hills neighborhood of Springfield, Virginia. Geer was fatally shot by Fairfax County Police Department officer Adam Torres, after a 42-minute standoff. Geer was unarmed with his hands raised above his shoulders, but a holstered gun was reportedly on the floor away from his body, as he was standing inside his Springfield townhouse. Geer's daughters filed a lawsuit that was settled in 2015 for $2.95 million. Torres was charged with second degree murder on August 27, 2015, and on June 25, 2016, pleaded guilty to involuntary manslaughter. He was sentenced to one-year imprisonment, including time served. Torres was released on June 29, 2016, just 5 days after he was convicted.

== Backgrounds ==
John Geer, 46, had two daughters. He was a graduate of J.E.B. Stuart High School.

Adam Torres, 32, had eight years of law enforcement experience. He had never fired his service weapon before shooting Geer. A number of news reports have been published on Torres' anger management issues, including statements made by Torres post-shooting regarding marital fights that may have been a factor.

== Shooting ==
Geer's partner called police to say that they were arguing, and that Geer was throwing her belongings onto the front lawn of the townhouse they shared. Fairfax County police arrived and Geer showed them a holstered firearm and told them "I have a gun; I will use it if I need to because you guys have guns" and then placed it on a nearby staircase. He continued to speak to a police hostage negotiator for approximately 42 minutes. Officer Torres had his handgun aimed at Geer from 17 feet away, and remained on post the entire time of the incident. Geer repeatedly asked Barnes to have Torres lower his weapon, which Barnes relayed to Torres on at least two occasions. Geer's daughters were taken to a neighbor's house during the stand-off, and one of them opened the door and shouted at the police, "Don't you hurt my daddy!" An officer responded by saying, "Don't come out. Keep the door closed."

Sometime between 3:30 PM and 3:45 PM, Torres claims that Geer started to lower his hands; however, four other police officers, including Officer Barnes, disagreed with Torres' version of the scene, including a statement that "he [Geer] didn't have to die that day." Torres fired one shot at Geer without warning, killing him. As Geer was shot, he swung around and went back inside his house and closed the front door. Not knowing the degree of injury to Geer, nor the threat he may have posed to both officers and the viewing spectators, a SWAT team arrived with an armored truck outfitted with a battering ram. When they entered the house, they found Geer lying just inside the front door. Paramedics pronounced him dead.

== Legal proceedings ==
The Fairfax County police homicide unit investigated the shooting and provided its file to Fairfax Commonwealth's Attorney Raymond F. Morrogh in late 2013. Torres was fired from the Fairfax County Police Department on July 31, 2015, due to violating the department's policies and procedures on the use of force. On August 17, 2015, a special grand jury in Fairfax County returned the indictment against Torres after hearing six days of testimony from nearly 20 witnesses. He was indicted on the charge of second-degree murder, and turned himself into Fairfax County Adult Detention Center on the same day. He was held without bail. It was the first time in the 75-year history of the Fairfax County Police Department that an officer had faced criminal charges in connection with an on-duty shooting.

On June 24, 2016, having pled guilty to manslaughter, Torres was sentenced to one year in jail. With time served of greater than 10 months, Torres was released 5 days after his sentencing hearing.

== Lawsuit ==
Geer's family filed a wrongful death lawsuit against Fairfax County on September 1, 2014, seeking $12 million in damages. On April 20, 2015, Fairfax County agreed to pay $2.95 million to Geer's daughters.

== Reaction ==
A group entitled Justice for Geer was established on Facebook, and has participated in protest events in Fairfax County. On January 8, 2015, members of the group participated in a demonstration held at the Fairfax County Police Department headquarters.
