= Lists of killings by law enforcement officers =

Following are lists of killings by law enforcement officers.

- List of killings by law enforcement officers in Belize
- List of killings by law enforcement officers in Canada
- List of killings by law enforcement officers in China
- List of killings by law enforcement officers in Germany
- List of killings by law enforcement officers in Poland
- List of killings by law enforcement officers in Sri Lanka
- List of killings by law enforcement officers in the United Kingdom
- Lists of killings by law enforcement officers in the United States

== See also ==
- Extrajudicial killings
- Encounter killings by police, a euphemism used in India, Pakistan and Afghanistan to describe extrajudicial killings by the police or the armed forces of suspected gangsters or terrorists in gun battles
- List of miscarriage of justice cases
- Police brutality by country
- Suicide by cop
