= List of killings by law enforcement officers in the United States, October 2024 =

This is a list of people reported killed by non-military law enforcement officers in the United States in October 2024, whether in the line of duty or not, and regardless of reason or method. The listing documents the occurrence of a death, making no implications regarding wrongdoing or justification on the part of the person killed or officer involved. Killings are arranged by date of the incident that caused death. Different death dates, if known, are noted in the description. The table below lists 116 people.

== October 2024 ==
Date	Name (age) of deceased	Race	Location	Description
2024-10-31	Wendell Smith (42)	Unknown	Marrero, Louisiana	While officers approached Smith during a drug investigation, he drove off. During the pursuit, a Plaquemines Parish deputy shot him. He died in a hospital.
2024-10-30	Andy Ernesto Espinoza Garay (26)	Hispanic	Triangle, Virginia	State Police responded to reports that four people carjacked a motorist on the I-95. Following a chase and crash, troopers shot the driver, Garay, after he made "furtive movements with his hands". Two other passengers were arrested.
2024-10-30	Juan Jose Puente Jr. (35)	White	Saraland, Alabama	Puente fled a traffic stop which led to a police chase. A standoff then occurred after he barricaded himself in his house. He fired at the officers and was killed by returned fire.
2024-10-30	Jesse Roach (40)	Unknown	Conyers, Georgia	Roach threatened a store clerk with a gun. As officers were attempting to detain him, he pushed past them and exited the store. One officer deployed a taser, but it was ineffective. Roach then pulled out a gun and shot at them before being fatally shot.
2024-10-29	Lawrence Scott (61)	Unknown	Phillips, Maine	Officers responded to calls for what was described as a potentially suicidal man on a bridge. The man, Scott, reportedly pointed a gun at a Franklin County deputy before being shot to death.
2024-10-28	Gerald Butler (10)	Black	Sarasota, Florida	Butler, an eight-year-old boy at the time, was riding a dirt bike before being hit by a SPD police cruiser. Butler succumbed to his injuries two years later.
2024-10-28	Kalvin Darapheth (17)	Asian	Findlay, Ohio	When officers were pursuing Darapheth, Darapheth opened fire on them. At which point, an officer discharged his weapon, killing him.
2024-10-28	Djuan Jackson (54)	Black	Jacksonville, Florida	Police stated that officers saw Jackson approached one of the carjacked victim's family members with a butter knife and made a stabbing motion. Officers believed that the family member was being stabbed so they shot and killed Jackson. The family member turned out to be unharmed.
2024-10-28	Jeremiah Johnson (37)	White	Delton, Michigan	A domestic situation ended with an officer-involved shooting. Johnson was reportedly armed.
2024-10-28	Kyle Miller (39)	White	Tulsa, Oklahoma	A man pointed a gun at officers after they attempted to provide mental health support. He was then fatally shot by the officers.
2024-10-28	Wilmer Sanchez-Hernandez (30)	Hispanic	Houston, Texas	After an initial domestic violence incident, on Monday, the suspect went to the relative's house and kidnapped the wife and child. HPD attempted to stop the suspect, but he fled and fired at officers several times. Later police executed a PIT maneuver on his vehicle as it attempted to enter the freeway, forcing it to stop, and officers shot the suspect dead.
2024-10-28	Rory Geiger (44)	White	Omaha, Nebraska	
2024-10-27	Lich Thanh Vu (72)	Asian	Oklahoma City, Oklahoma	An officer pulled Vu over for an illegal U-turn. After an argument, the officer threw Vu to the ground, resulting in severe injuries. The officer was charged with assault, but these charges were dropped by the Attorney General. Vu was left bedridden after the encounter and died from his injuries in September 2025.
2024-10-27	unidentified male (68)	Unknown	Willow Grove, Pennsylvania	
2024-10-27	Julius Hill (25)	Unknown	Indianapolis, Indiana	Hill carjacked a woman, who drove her vehicle to a nearby location where police officers were congregated. He was shot by police after allegedly pointing a gun at officers and people nearby. Hill died of his injuries on November 14.
2024-10-26	Andy Morales (40)	Hispanic	Fresno, California	A homicide suspect reportedly shot and injured a sergeant while he was in his vehicle. The sergeant then pursued the suspect until he crashed his vehicle. The suspect fired again, at which point the sergeant and the responding officers returned fire, killing the suspect.
2024-10-25	Brian Dingman (58)	Unknown	Fairfield, California	
2024-10-25	unidentified male (56)	Unknown	Dickinson, North Dakota	Dickinson Police shot and killed a man who shot at them following a domestic dispute call.
2024-10-25	Michael Richard Bryant (39)	Unknown	Minot, North Dakota	Minot Police responded to a domestic disturbance call and fatally shot a man. What prompted is unknown.
2024-10-25	James Marshall (27)	White	Carmel-by-the-Sea, California	Police shot and killed Marshall following reports of a man holding a rifle in a residential neighborhood. Marshall was holding a BB gun that resembled a real rifle.
2024-10-23	Ivan Guttierez (26)	Hispanic	Houston, Texas	US Marshals were serving a felony warrant on Guttierez, who was accused of stabbing his girlfriend last week. When they approached the front door and announced themselves, Guttierez fired his gun and went out with a shotgun. Officers then shot and killed him.
2024-10-23	Adayn Rodriguez (41)	Hispanic	Haines City, Florida	Rodriguez was shot and killed after killing his wife and a standoff with Polk County Sheriff's Office. He reportedly pointed a gun at them before being shot by a lieutenant and entry team officers.
2024-10-23	Elroy Clarke (42)	Black	Punta Gorda, Florida	Charlotte County Sheriff’s Office responded to a disturbance call. However, they found out the homeowner had a warrant out for his arrest. When they attempted to arrest Clarke, he resisted and charged at a deputy before being shot. Tasers, pepper spray and beanbag rounds were ineffective.
2024-10-23	Ian Sullivan (54)	White	Boaz, Alabama	
2024-10-22	Jacob Lorenzo Vela (38)	Hispanic	Goodyear, Arizona	
2024-10-22	Terrell Laron Hoggro (59)	Black	Chamblee, Georgia	
2024-10-22	Christopher Allen Smith, Jr. (27)	White	Corpus Christi, Texas	
2024-10-22	unidentified juvenile	White	Poplar Bluff, Missouri	
2024-10-22	Abram Perez (42)	Unknown	DeKalb Township, DeKalb County, Illinois	
2024-10-22	Phillip Scott Duelley (41)	White	Malden, West Virginia	Police and sheriff's deputies pursued Duelley into the woods. An officer shot and killed Duelley after he allegedly pointed a gun at them.
2024-10-22	Matthew James Fries (43)	White	Ravenna, Ohio	Police responded to reports of a man stabbed on a hiking trail. While investigating, Fries, the alleged attacker, exited the woods holding an axe. Officers shot and killed him.
2024-10-21	unidentified male (51)	Unknown	Paterson, New Jersey	An off-duty officer struck and killed a pedestrian with his vehicle while he was leaving a parking lot.
2024-10-21	Allen V. Hoad II (50)	White	Cameron, New York	
2024-10-21	Wiley Jarvis Casstevens (53)	White	Jonesville, North Carolina	
2024-10-21	Anthony Rodriguez Jr. (22)	White	Corpus Christi, Texas	When Corpus Christi officers were taking a prisoner to detention center, they heard the shots fired by the suspect. One of the officer shot and killed the suspect.
2024-10-20	Jamie Orozco (43)	Hispanic	Sioux City, Iowa	A woman called the police after a man approached her, later identified as Orozco. When police arrived, he shot at them and officers returned fire. He then fled the scene and police set a perimeter. Police claimed that they located him on a house’s second floor. He refused to surrender and was shot by SWAT team members. He died 7 days later.
2024-10-20	Essex Jackson (31)	Hispanic	Phoenix, Arizona	
2024-10-19	Marvin Taylor (57)	Unknown	Pemberton Township, New Jersey	
2024-10-19	Jose David Guillen Socorro (18)	Unknown	Aurora, Colorado	Socorro reportedly assaulted a woman, threatened the 911 caller, and took the woman hostage in an apartment. Hostage negotiators were able to get the man to release the woman and tried to apprehend Socorro. However, Socorro came outside and shot at them before being killed by returned fire.
2024-10-19	Francisco Campos (36)	Unknown	Lincoln City, Oregon	Lincoln City Police shot and killed Campos after he reached for his firearms in his waistband following a domestic disturbance call.
2024-10-19	Taylor Cotton (26)	Unknown	Dayton, Ohio	Montgomery County Sheriff's Office responded to a mental health call. They shot and killed the suspect after he pointed a gun at them.
2024-10-19	Michael S. Oswalt II (41)	White	Mansfield, Ohio	A domestic violence incident escalated to a hostage situation after Mansfield Department arrived on scene. The suspect held his girlfriend and 2 children hostage for about 3 hours while negotiating with the police. At some point, the hostages tried to escape the suspect and officers fatally shot the suspect.
2024-10-19	Milo Kirsh (45)	Unknown	Lawrenceburg, Indiana	A man was threatening and chasing another person with a knife. When the Indiana State Police arrived, they found the man firing shots on the fourth floor of Hollywood Casino Hotel. At some point a shootout occurred which left the suspect dead.
2024-10-18	Kathleen Fresard (71)	White	Owenton, Kentucky	While an Owen County Sheriff’s Office deputy was responding to a call with his sirens and lights on, Fresard allegedly turned left into the path of his Tahoe, which caused the crash. She later died from her injuries.
2024-10-18	unidentified male	Unknown	Bardwell, Kentucky	Kentucky State Police was notified that a suspect shot his wife. When they saw the suspect and arrived there, at some point, the male fired a gun and they returned fire, killing him. A female was found dead at the home.
2024-10-18	Matthew Freddie Garcia (39)	Unknown	Albuquerque, New Mexico	During a drug bust, the suspect was detained by Albuquerque Police Department for 45 minutes without noticing that he had a gun. When they tried to remove him from the patrol car, they noticed that he was armed. The suspect resisted while officers tried to disarm him. That's when the officers shot him.
2024-10-17	Fernando Guerrero Esparza (39)	Hispanic	Banning, California	Riverside County Sheriff's Department responded to calls for an armed suspect. The suspect charged at an officer with a knife before being fatally shot.
2024-10-17	Rick Alastor Newman (29)	White	Bozeman, Montana	Bozeman Police responded to a call about a woman threatening family members with a gun. When they found her, she was armed with a handgun. After almost 3 hours of communication, she put the gun down and grabbed it suddenly. The officers then shot her.
2024-10-16	Desmund Louis Moore (42)	Black	Mount Airy, North Carolina	Mount Airy Police was involved in a pursuit of three suspects, which one of them was wanted for a double homicide in Cumberland County. When the vehicle crashed and officers attempted to arrest them, Moore fired at the police, leading to the death of K9 Draco. Mount Airy Police then returned fire, killing him.
2024-10-16	Robert Michael Wemmer (71)	Unknown	Murfreesboro, Tennessee	
2024-10-15	unidentified male	Unknown	Prescott, Arizona	Officials stated that a husband may have shot and killed his estranged wife. A reserve officer who lived nearby shot and killed the husband to stop further threats.
2024-10-15	Kevin Harris (36)	White	Richmond, Virginia	RPD received a call of a man threatening someone with a knife. The officers then found him in a room of a building with a female and asked them to leave, but they did not. Later the officers heard a scream from the female in the room, at which point, they got in the room and shot Harris. He died a day later.
2024-10-15	Lucas Alleman (43)	Unknown	Boise, Idaho	Two Ada County Sheriff’s Office deputies fatally shot Alleman, who reportedly pointed a handgun at them at a youth sporting complex. The man was being sought in connection to a sex crime case.
2024-10-15	Joseph Horan (32)	White	Walterboro, South Carolina	A Colleton County deputy were called to a Ruby Tuesday after receiving reports of a man slashing tires of vehicles and breaking windows. When a deputy arrived, the deputy reportedly talked to the man, before the man reportedly attacked the deputy while simultaneously armed with a knife. The deputy then shot the man.
2024-10-15	Louie Archuleta (28)	Hispanic	Roswell, New Mexico	For undisclosed reasons, Archuleta was engaged in a vehicle pursuit with Roswell. At some point Archuleta crashed into a vehicle at an intersection. When he reportedly attempted to flee on foot, he was shot multiple times by numerous police officers.
2024-10-15	Rosny Josafath Rodriguis-Midence (21)	Unknown	Kerrville, Texas	Kerrville Police with Fredericksburg Police and the Gillespie County Sheriff's Office ended a pursuit of a vehicle which fled a traffic stop. When they encountered the suspect, the suspect charged at a KPD officer before being fatally shot.
2024-10-15	Jeremy Taylor Culp (32)	Black	West Orange, Texas	
2024-10-15	unidentified male	Unknown	Elizabeth, Colorado	When Elbert County Sheriff's Office was serving a search warrant, a shootout occurred between the deputies and the suspect, which left a deputy injured and the suspect dead.
2024-10-14	Jacob Moss (45)	White	Detroit, Michigan	Moss, an off-duty Detroit Police officer, shot and injured two other officers who were responding to reports of a suicide attempt at his home. One of the officers returned fire, striking Moss, who was wearing his police uniform at the time.
2024-10-14	Aaron Dusinberre (39)	Unknown	Newport News, Virginia	A suicidal suspect pointed a BB gun at Newport News Police before being fatally shot.
2024-10-14	Jonathan A. Beason (37)	Unknown	Columbia, Missouri	Callaway County Sheriff's Department conducted a traffic stop on Beason, a Texas man who had multiple felony warrants out for his arrest. When officers tried to arrest him, he resisted and began shooting. Both officers were shot and they returned fire, killing Beason.
2024-10-13	Anthony James Valdez (46)	Hispanic	Salt Lake City, Utah	Utah Highway Patrol was notified that a man was running through traffic on Interstate 15. When they found the man, the man fled. During the foot chase, a trooper deployed a taser which caused him to fall 30 feet from the off-ramp into a yard below. He was pronounced dead at the scene.
2024-10-13	Matthew Sanchez (41)	Hispanic	Albuquerque, New Mexico	During a domestic disturbance investigation, APD officers encountered an individual with a gun and was non-compliant. A shootout then occurred between the officers and the suspect. An officer was wounded and the suspect was killed.
2024-10-12	Keuntae ZyQuil Stewart (22)	Black	Bainbridge, Georgia	State troopers performed a PIT maneuver on Stewart's vehicle while attempting to pull him over, resulting in his death.
2024-10-12	Justin Rodriguez (23)	Hispanic	Big Spring, Texas	
2024-10-12	Jonathan Macias (27)	Hispanic	Wichita, Kansas	Sedgwick County Sheriff’s Office with multiple agencies responded to a call about a man threatening to shoot someone. When they arrived, they found the man in a car with ballistic armor and tried to de-escalate the situation. At some point, the man charged at them before being shot. It is unknown if he was armed.
2024-10-11	unidentified male	Unknown	Cataño, Puerto Rico	A police officer approached a motorcycle that had been reported stolen. Upon approaching, two men on the motorcycle allegedly fired at the officer. The officer fired back, hitting and killing both men.
2024-10-11	unidentified male	Unknown	Cataño, Puerto Rico	A police officer approached a motorcycle that had been reported stolen. Upon approaching, two men on the motorcycle allegedly fired at the officer. The officer fired back, hitting and killing both men.
2024-10-11	Kenneth Wayne Foster, Jr. (37)	White	Fork Union, Virginia	A suspect was found to be hiding inside a wall in the structure. When Fluvanna County Sheriff’s Office tried to take him into custody, he fired at them before being killed by returned fire.
2024-10-11	Isaiah Cross (50)	Unknown	Newport, Arkansas	
2024-10-10	Uriah Daniel Howder (16)	White	Mount Carmel, Illinois	During a domestic dispute investigation, a Mt. Carmel police officer allegedly encountered a juvenile with a knife then fatally shot him. Another teenager was also struck by gunfire.
2024-10-10	Annette Prince (77)	Unknown	Oklahoma City, Oklahoma	
2024-10-10	Dejuane Aki Hayden (30)	Black	Jacksonville, Florida	As Jacksonville Sheriff's Office approached 3 men, one of them fled with a gun. An officer who was chasing him shot and killed him. The three men were allegedly conducting drug transactions.
2024-10-10	Juan Wu (48)	Hispanic	Hollywood, Florida	An officer responding to a dispute between neighbors shot and killed Wu, who police claimed attacked the officer. Wu's brother said he had mental health issues.
2024-10-10	Jason Torres (41)	Unknown	Roswell, New Mexico	Torres reportedly fled a traffic stop before a chase ensued. When Roswell Police located him, he allegedly fled with a gun before being shot.
2024-10-10	Antonio Lavar Sullivan (37)	Unknown	Gray Court, South Carolina	Laurens County Sheriff’s Office was notified that a wanted person was possibly in the Gray Court after a reported kidnapping and vehicle chase in Spartanburg. They later found the car and found the children unharmed. When they encountered the armed man, they fatally shot him.
2024-10-09	unidentified male	Unknown	Riverside, Texas	
2024-10-09	Henry Chavez, Jr. (28)	Unknown	Taylorsville, Utah	
2024-10-09	unidentified male	Unknown	Castle Rock, Colorado	A man barricaded himself inside an apartment complex leasing office and also armed with a shotgun. When Castle Rock PD arrived, the man shot at them before being shot to death.
2024-10-09	Robert Phillip Nedd Jr (54)	Black	Baltimore, Maryland	After a pursuit of a vehicle which had caused a crash, Baltimore officers located the driver in a ditch. They shot him when they noticed that he was armed.
2024-10-09	Patrick Neal Champion (61)	Unknown	Lake Havasu City, Arizona	When Lake Havasu police detectives were investigating a missing person case, someone opened fire on them. The detectives returned fire, killing the suspect.
2024-10-09	William George Skells (37)	Unknown	Thornton, Colorado	Police responded to a shots fired call. When they encountered the suspect, a shootout occurred which left two officers injured and the male suspect dead.
2024-10-08	Jerson D. Martinez (28)	Hispanic	Monon, Indiana	White County Sheriff’s Deputies responded to a disturbance call and found a suspect. The suspect advanced toward deputies with a knife before being shot.
2024-10-08	Roman Urbano Jr. (43)	Hispanic	San Antonio, Texas	
2024-10-08	Samuel Story (44)	White	Chattanooga, Tennessee	US Marshals were trying to locate a man apartment complex. A confrontation with two men in a vehicle occurred. When marshals tried to stop the vehicle from leaving, Story, who was the driver, backed the car up and dragged a marshal with the door of the vehicle. The marshal then opened fire, killing Story.
2024-10-08	unidentified male	White	Detroit, Michigan	As DPD officers approached a man who had a parole violation, the man shot at the officers. An officer then shot and killed the man.
2024-10-08	Timothy Kurt Holden (60)	White	Kalamazoo, Michigan	A suspect reportedly threatened two people in a car. When the Kalamazoo Department of Public Safety officers arrived, the suspect produced a gun before being shot.
2024-10-08	Matthew D. Kemper (41)	White	Colorado Springs, Colorado	CSPD were told that a suicidal man was involved in a disturbance. During the encounter, the man approached the officers with a knife before being fatally shot.
2024-10-07	Tony Dupree Coward (34)	Unknown	Arlington, Texas	Arlington Police Department officers approached an armed man who was lying on his back on the hood of a vehicle. After they identify themselves and ordered the man to show his hands, the man retrieved the gun and raised it. At which point both officers shot him.
2024-10-07	Bryan Testerman Jr. (57)	White	Knoxville, Tennessee	
2024-10-06	Larry Reeves III (27)	White	Waxahachie, Texas	
2024-10-06	Omar Jermaine Redditt (43)	Black	Wilkes-Barre, Pennsylvania	
2024-10-06	unidentified male	Unknown	College Park, Georgia	A man was seen pointing a gun at people. A MPD officer located the man and ordered him to drop it. The officer shot him after he reached in the direction of the gun. The man died at a hospital.
2024-10-06	Logan Kilpatrick (18)	White	Millington, Tennessee	Tipton County Sheriff's Office responded to a report about a man threatening residents with a gun. Upon arrival, gunfire was exchanged between the suspect and a deputy which left the suspect dead.
2024-10-06	Shawn D. Hill (46)	Black	Chesterfield, Virginia	Police shot and killed a person who allegedly shot at them during a traffic stop.
2024-10-05	Joseph Keith Neimeyer (48)	White	Sundance, Wyoming	Deputies responded to a home invasion call. Upon arrival, they engaged the suspect who was walking down a road. The suspect pointed a gun at them, prompting the deputies to shoot him.
2024-10-05	David Septer (44)	White	Wadsworth, Ohio	Police was dispatched on a report of an armed individual who was possibly heading to a high school. Officers conducted a traffic stop on the suspect. He exited the vehicle with a gun and was shot.
2024-10-05	Deyaa Abdelhadi Halaibeh (28)	Unknown	Santa Monica, California	An officer shot and killed a man who reportedly stabbed him outside the police department.
2024-10-04	Adam Rodriguez (26)	Hispanic	Nashville, Tennessee	Rodriguez reportedly carjacked a rideshare driver and was chased by police until Rodriguez fled on foot into the back porch of a house. An officer repeatedly told Rodriguez to drop the gun he was allegedly holding and was shot and killed when he did not comply.
2024-10-04	Percy Hawkins (37)	Black	Las Vegas, Nevada	Hawkins ran toward the police with a knife and a metal necklace before being shot by a Las Vegas Metropolitan Police Department officer.
2024-10-04	Allison Seitz (32)	White	Plano, Texas	Plano PD responded to a disturbance call. Upon arrival, officers encountered a woman behaving erratically while holding a gun. Since negotiation was ineffective, they fired shots, fatally striking her.
2024-10-04	Ilya Beloozerov (53)	White	Hernando, Mississippi	FBI task force members shot and killed a man under unknown circumstances.
2024-10-04	Deondre Martin (33)	Black	Milwaukee, Wisconsin	Milwaukee Police responded to a shooting and found three victims jumping off second-story porch and an armed suspect on the porch. They ordered the suspect to drop the weapon but he did not comply. An officer then shot him. A victim was in life-threatening condition related to the incident.
2024-10-04	Nicholas G. Thorn (28)	White	Portland, Oregon	Portland Police received a report of a man yelling and making threats. Upon arrival, an officer fatally shot Thorn, who was armed with a pellet air rifle and a knife.
2024-10-03	unidentified male	Unknown	Tahlequah, Oklahoma	US Marshals shot and killed a man while serving a federal warrant. Marshals said the man fired at agents.
2024-10-03	Edward Jensen Dass (39)	Unknown	Loma Linda, California	San Bernardino County deputies responded to a call and encountered a man. At some point, they opened fire and killed the man. A knife was recovered at the scene.
2024-10-03	Billy Gordon (43)	White	Temple, Texas	A 911 caller told Temple Police that Gordon, who was on drugs, was having abnormal behavior. When the officers arrived, they saw that Gordon was pulling things out of a fridge and drinking several different items. According to police, when he attempted to drink another item, officers tased him 4 times to prevent him from drinking it. He then became unconscious and died about a minute later.
2024-10-03	Robert Jones (54)	Black	Philadelphia, Pennsylvania	As Jones approached an off-duty Philadelphia police detective's vehicle, the detective inside vehicle shot and killed him for reasons unknown.
2024-10-03	Charles Sanders (69)	Black	Belleville, Illinois	St. Clair County sheriff's Office responded to a domestic disturbance call and confronted Sanders armed with a gun. One of the deputies then shot and killed him.
2024-10-03	Brian Maloney (41)	White	San Diego, California	On Fiesta Island, an off-duty San Diego Community College District Police officer was stabbed by a man multiple times while he was walking his dog. He then shot and killed the attacker with his personal weapon.
2024-10-03	Kory Dillard (38)	Black	Aurora, Colorado	Aurora Police responded to a report of a fight in an apartment complex. The officers shot a man with an assault type of weapon after they demanded him to drop it. According to the man's family members, the weapon might be an airsoft gun.
2024-10-02	J Felix Guadalupe Manzo Chocoteco (39)	Hispanic	Bakersfield, California	Bakersfield Police responded to a 911 call and found a man who broke into the caller's house. An officer-involved shooting occurred which left the man dead.
2024-10-01	unidentified male	Unknown	Flint, Michigan	Flint Police deployed unspecified compliance control measures to a combative suspect. The man suffered a medical emergency and died at the scene.
2024-10-01	Alberto Rodriguez (28)	Black	Avon Park, Florida	Highlands County Sheriff's Office attempted to take Rodriguez into custody for threatening people with a knife. At some point, he escaped the deputies and threw a weight at them. One deputy shot him after he grabbed a second one.
2024-10-01	Jason Alexander Fox (27)	White	Tempe, Arizona	Fox shot and injured a Tempe Police officer during a traffic stop. Other officers on scene returned fire, killing him. He was wanted for aggravated assault with a deadly weapon.
2024-10-01	Malcolm Burns (34)	Unknown	Northwood, New Hampshire	A Northwood police officer responded to a domestic violence report. During the encounter, an altercation ensued between Burns and the officer, which led to the shooting. As a result, the officer was injured and Burns was killed. According to media, Burns was armed during the incident.

== See also ==
- Death in custody § United States
- Henry A. Wallace Police Crime Public Database
- List of cases of police brutality
- List of countries with annual rates and counts for killings by law enforcement officers
- List of law enforcement officers killed in the line of duty in the United States
- List of law enforcement officers convicted for an on-duty killing in the United States
- List of shootings by US immigration agents
- List of police reforms related to the George Floyd protests
- List of unarmed African Americans killed by law enforcement officers in the United States
- Lists of killings by law enforcement officers
- Police brutality in the United States
- Police misconduct § United States
- Police riot § United States
- Police use of deadly force in the United States
