= Coalition for Effective Public Safety =

U.S. criminal justice reform coalition

Coalition for Effective Public Safety (CEPS) is a California-based criminal justice reform coalition of approximately 40 organizations united behind specific principles aimed at increasing public safety in California while curtailing the reliance upon costly, ineffective practices such as mass incarceration.

CEPS works through advocacy, organizing and public education to reduce prison spending by:

a. eliminating barriers to successful re-entry for those coming home from prison;
b. reducing recidivism through effective educational and vocational programming and comprehensive treatment;
c. opposing new prison construction in California;
d. utilizing parole reform, sentencing reform and re-investment in communities to reduce the number of people in prison.

== Member organizations ==
CEPS member organizations include:

- A New Way of Life
- Action Committee for Women in Prison
- All of Us or None
- American Civil Liberties Union
- American Friends' Service Committee
- A New PATH
- Behind the Walls
- Books Not Bars
- California Attorneys for Criminal Justice
- California Families Against Mandatory Minimums
- California Prison Moratorium Project
- California State NAACP
- Center for Young Women’s Development
- Center on Juvenile and Criminal Justice
- Centerforce
- Citizens for the Three Strikes Reform
- Critical Resistance
- Drug Policy Alliance
- Ella Baker Center for Human Rights
- ESPINO Coalition
- Families to Amend California‘s Three Strikes
- Friends Committee on Legislation
- Get on the Bus
- Justice Now
- Justice Policy Institute
- Legal Services for Prisoners with Children
- Lutheran Office of Public Policy
- Murder Victims’ Families for Reconciliation, Inc.
- National Action Network- CA Chapter
- PICO California Project
- Progressive Christians Uniting
- SEIU-Local 535
- SEIU-Local 1000
- SEIU-State Council
- Women & Criminal Justice
- Youth Against Youth Incarceration
- Youth in Focus
- Youth Justice Coalition/ Free LA!

== See also ==
- Department of Public Safety
