= Lawrence Livermore National Laboratory =

Federal research center in California, US

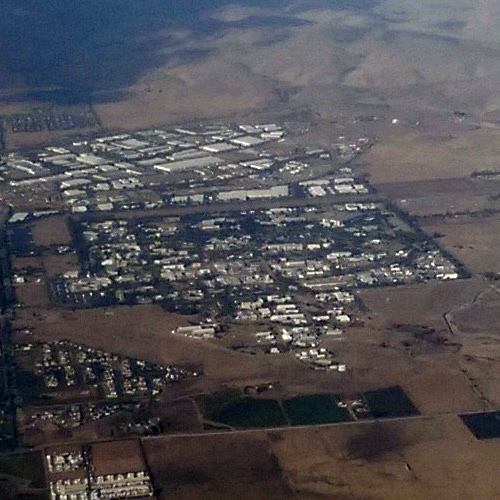
- Aerial view of the square LLNL campus (center) from the south. On the south side of LLNL is Sandia National Laboratories and to the north is the neighborhood of Ulmar.
- Motto: "Science and technology on a mission"
- Established: September 2, 1952; 74 years ago
- Research type: Nuclear and basic science
- Budget: $3.25 billion
- Director: Kimberly S. Budil
- Staff: 9,563
- Location: Livermore, California, U.S. 37.69°N 121.71°W
- Campus: 1 square mile (2.6 km^{2})
- Affiliations: United States Department of Energy
- Operating agency: Lawrence Livermore National Security, LLC
- Website: llnl.gov

Map
- Location within California

Lawrence Livermore National Laboratory (LLNL) is a federally funded research and development center in Livermore, California, United States. Established in 1952, the laboratory is sponsored by the United States Department of Energy and administered privately by Lawrence Livermore National Security, LLC.

The lab was originally established as the University of California Radiation Laboratory, Livermore Branch in 1952 in response to the detonation of the Soviet Union's first atomic bomb during the Cold War. It later became autonomous in 1971 and was designated a national laboratory in 1981.

Lawrence Livermore Lab is primarily funded by the United States Congress and it is managed privately and operated by Lawrence Livermore National Security, LLC (a partnership of the University of California, Bechtel, BWX Technologies, Amentum, and Battelle Memorial Institute in affiliation with the Texas A&M University System). In 2012, the synthetic chemical element livermorium (element 116) first made in year 2000, was named after the laboratory.

The Livermore facility was co-founded by Edward Teller and Ernest Lawrence, then director of the Radiation Laboratory at Berkeley.

== Overview ==
LLNL is a research and development institution for science and technology applied to national security. Its principal responsibility is ensuring the safety, security and reliability of the nation's nuclear weapons through the application of advanced science, engineering, and technology. The laboratory also applies its special expertise and multidisciplinary capabilities towards preventing the proliferation and use of weapons of mass destruction, bolstering homeland security, and solving other nationally important problems, including energy and environmental needs, scientific research and outreach, and economic competitiveness.

The laboratory is located on a 1 square mile (2.6 km^{2}) site at the eastern edge of Livermore. It also operates a 7,000 acres (28 km^{2}) remote experimental test site known as Site 300, situated about 15 miles (24 km) southeast of the main lab site. LLNL has an annual budget of about $3.25 billion and a staff of nearly 10,000 employees.

== History ==
=== Origins ===
LLNL was established in 1952, as the University of California Radiation Laboratory, Livermore Branch, an offshoot of the existing University of California Radiation Laboratory at Berkeley. The lab at Livermore was intended to spur innovation and provide competition to the nuclear weapon design laboratory at Los Alamos in New Mexico, home of the Manhattan Project that developed the first atomic weapons. The Livermore facility was co-founded by Edward Teller and Ernest Lawrence, director of the Radiation Laboratory at Berkeley.

The new laboratory was sited at a former naval air station from World War II. It was already home to several University of California Radiation Laboratory projects that were too large for its location in the Berkeley Hills above the UC campus, including one of the first experiments in the magnetic approach to confined thermonuclear reactions (i.e. fusion). About half an hour southeast of Berkeley, the Livermore site provided much greater security for classified projects than an urban university campus.

Lawrence tapped his former graduate student Herbert York, age 32, to run Livermore. Under York, the Lab had four main programs: Project Sherwood (the magnetic-fusion program), Project Whitney (the weapons-design program), diagnostic weapon experiments (both for the Los Alamos and Livermore laboratories), and a basic physics program. York and the new lab embraced the Lawrence "big science" approach, tackling challenging projects with physicists, chemists, engineers, and computational scientists working together in multidisciplinary teams. Lawrence died in August 1958 and shortly after, the university's board of regents named both laboratories for him, as the Lawrence Radiation Laboratory.

Historically, the Berkeley and Livermore laboratories have had very close relationships on research projects, business operations, and staff. The Livermore Lab was established initially as a branch of the Berkeley laboratory. The Livermore lab was not officially severed administratively from the Berkeley lab until 1971. To this day, in official planning documents and records, Lawrence Berkeley National Laboratory is designated as Site 100, Lawrence Livermore National Lab as Site 200, and LLNL's remote test location as Site 300.

=== Renaming ===
The laboratory was renamed Lawrence Livermore Laboratory (LLL) in 1971. On October 1, 2007 Lawrence Livermore National Security, LLC (LLNS) assumed management of LLNL from the University of California, which had exclusively managed and operated the Laboratory since its inception 55 years before. The laboratory was honored in 2012 by having the synthetic chemical element livermorium named after it.

The LLNS takeover of the laboratory has been controversial. In May 2013, an Alameda County jury awarded over $2.7 million to five former laboratory employees who were among 430 employees LLNS laid off during 2008. The jury found that LLNS breached a contractual obligation to terminate the employees only for "reasonable cause." The five plaintiffs also have pending age discrimination claims against LLNS, which will be heard by a different jury in a separate trial. There are 125 co-plaintiffs awaiting trial on similar claims against LLNS. The May 2008 layoff was the first layoff at the laboratory in nearly 40 years.

On March 14, 2011, the City of Livermore officially expanded the city's boundaries to annex LLNL and move it within the city limits. The unanimous vote by the Livermore city council expanded Livermore's southeastern boundaries to cover 15 land parcels covering 1,057 acres (4.28 km^{2}) that comprise the LLNL site. The site was formerly an unincorporated area of Alameda County. The LLNL campus continues to be owned by the federal government.

== Major projects ==
=== Nuclear weapons ===
Bowline Schooner, a nuclear test conducted by LLNL in the 1960s

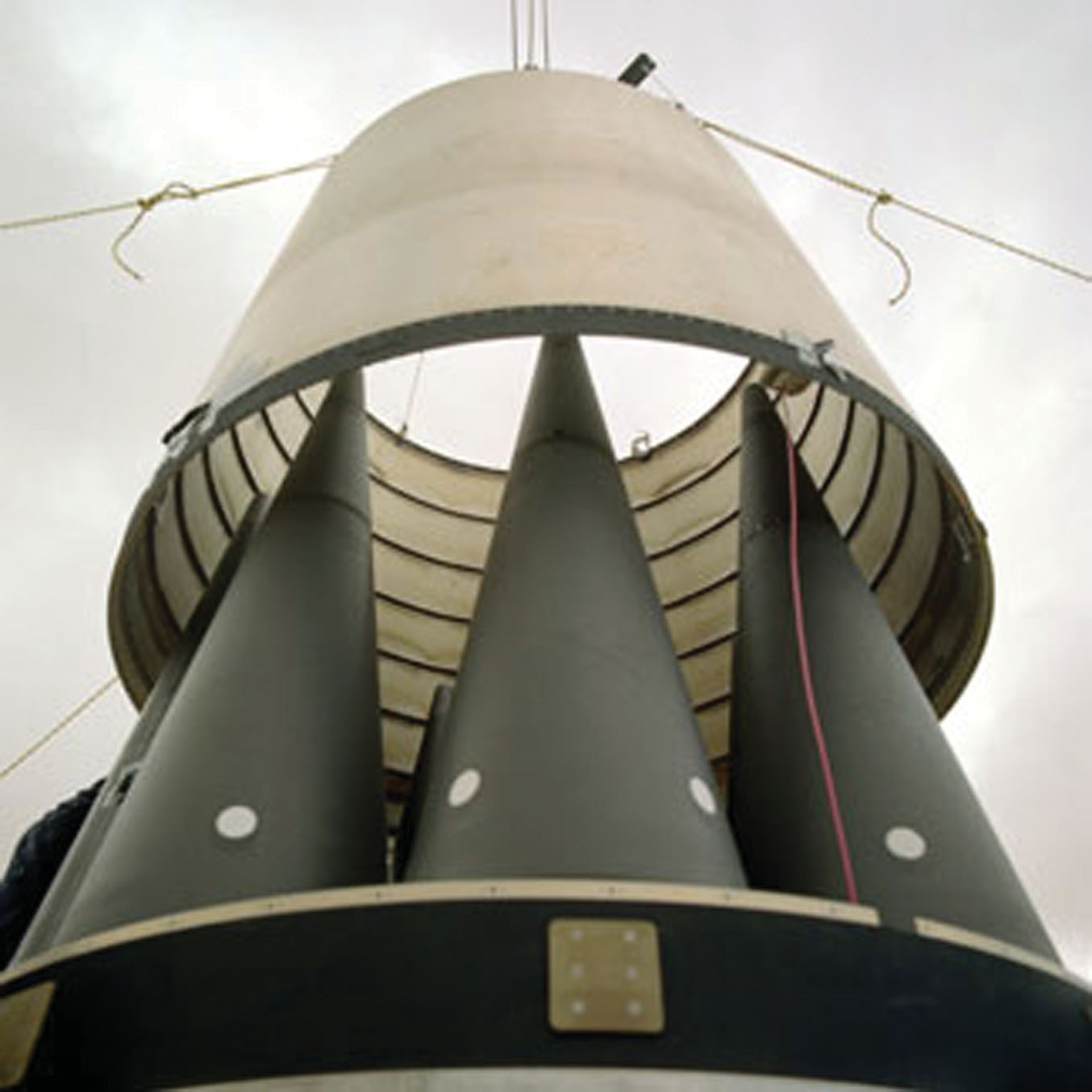
Warheads designed by the LLNL on a LGM-118A missile, a type of missile still in the US nuclear stockpile

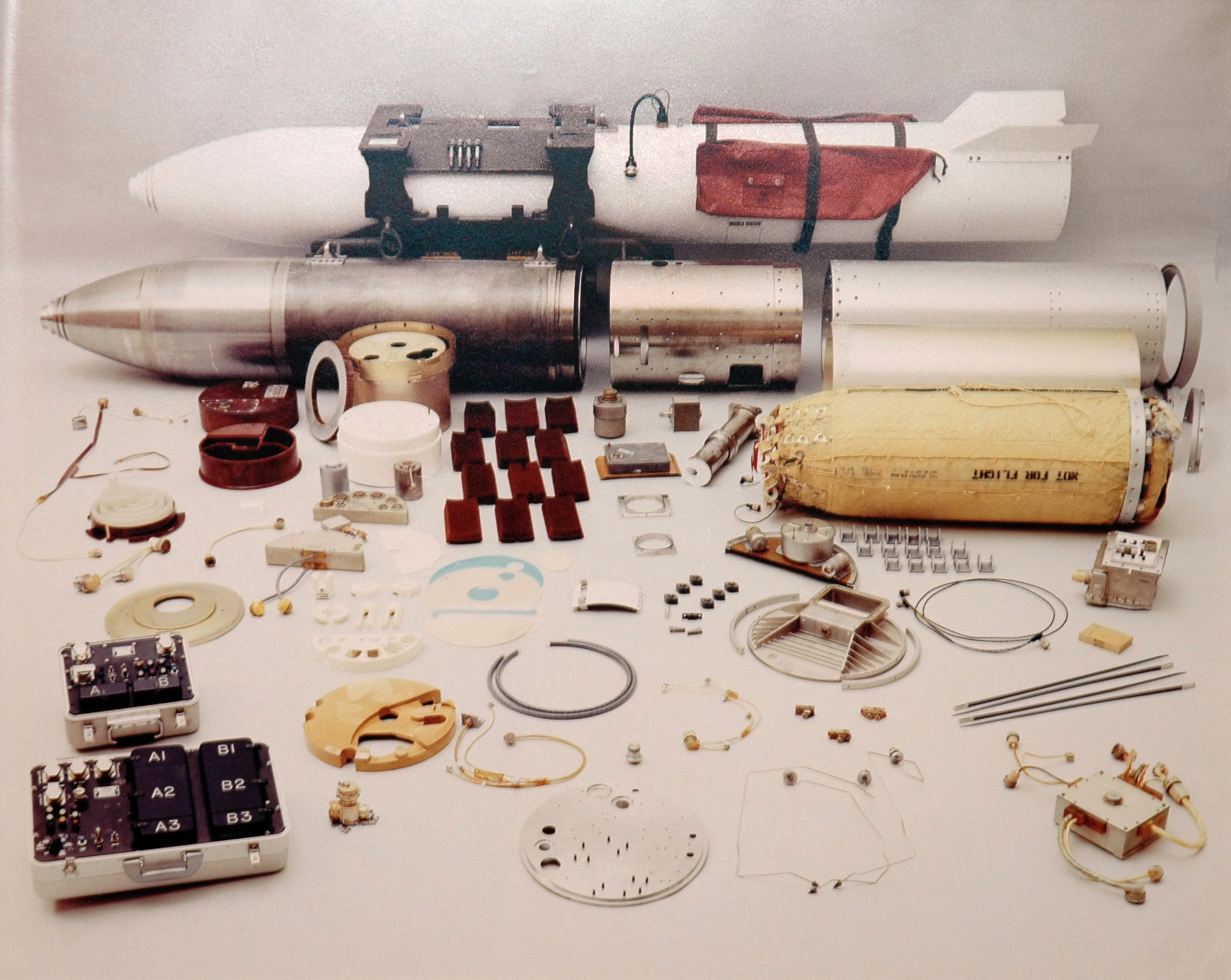
The B83, a nuclear weapon whose warhead was developed by LLNL that is still in the US nuclear stockpile

From its inception, Livermore focused on new weapon design concepts; as a result, its first three nuclear tests (Note: These were the uranium hydride devices "Ruth" and "Ray", tested during Operation Upshot–Knothole.) were unsuccessful. The lab persevered and its subsequent designs proved increasingly successful. In 1957, the Livermore Lab was selected to develop the warhead for the Navy's Polaris missile. This warhead required numerous innovations to fit a nuclear warhead into the relatively small confines of the missile nosecone.

During the Cold War, many Livermore-designed warheads entered service. These were used in missiles ranging in size from the Lance surface-to-surface tactical missile to the megaton-class Spartan antiballistic missile. Over the years, LLNL designed the warheads: W27 (Regulus cruise missile; 1955; joint with Los Alamos), W38 (Atlas/Titan ICBM; 1959), B41 (B52 bomb; 1957), W45 (Little John/Terrier missiles; 1956), W47 (Polaris SLBM; 1957), W48 (155-mm howitzer; 1957), W55 (submarine rocket; 1959), W56 (Minuteman ICBM; 1960), W58 (Polaris SLBM; 1960), W62 (Minuteman ICBM; 1964), W68 (Poseidon SLBM; 1966), W70 (Lance missile; 1969), W71 (Spartan missile; 1968), W79 (8-in. artillery gun; 1975), W82 (155-mm howitzer; 1978), B83 (modern strategic bomb; 1979), and W87 (LGM-118 Peacekeeper/MX ICBM; 1982). The W87 and the B83 are the only LLNL designs still in the U.S. nuclear stockpile.

With the collapse of the Soviet Union in 1991 and the end of the Cold War, the United States began a moratorium on nuclear testing and development of new nuclear weapon designs. To sustain existing warheads for the indefinite future, a science-based Stockpile Stewardship Program (SSP) was defined that emphasized the development and application of greatly improved technical capabilities to assess the safety, security, and reliability of existing nuclear warheads without the use of nuclear testing. Confidence in the performance of weapons, without nuclear testing, is maintained through an ongoing process of stockpile surveillance, assessment and certification, and refurbishment or weapon replacement.

With no new designs of nuclear weapons, the warheads in the U.S. stockpile must continue to function far past their original expected lifetimes. As components and materials age, problems can arise. Stockpile Life Extension Programs can extend system lifetimes, but they also can introduce performance uncertainties and require maintenance of outdated technologies and materials. Because there is concern that it will become increasingly difficult to maintain high confidence in the warheads for the long term, the Department of Energy/National Nuclear Security Administration initiated the Reliable Replacement Warhead (RRW) Program. RRW designs could reduce uncertainties, ease maintenance demands, and enhance safety and security. In March 2007, the LLNL design was chosen for the Reliable Replacement Warhead. Since that time, Congress has not allocated funding for any further development of the RRW.

=== Plutonium research ===
LLNL conducts research into the properties and behavior of plutonium to learn how plutonium performs as it ages and how it behaves under high pressure (e.g., with the impact of high explosives). Plutonium has seven temperature-dependent solid allotropes. Each possesses a different density and crystal structure. Alloys of plutonium are even more complex; multiple phases can be present in a sample at any given time. Experiments are conducted at LLNL and elsewhere to measure the structural, electrical and chemical properties of plutonium and its alloys and to determine how these materials change over time. Such measurements enable scientists to better model and predict plutonium's long-term behavior in the aging stockpile.

The Lab's plutonium research is conducted in a specially designed facility called the SuperBlock, with emphasis on safety and security. Work with highly enriched uranium is also conducted there. In March 2008, the National Nuclear Security Administration (NNSA) presented its preferred alternative for the transformation of the nation's nuclear weapons complex. Under this plan, LLNL would be a center of excellence for nuclear design and engineering, a center of excellence for high explosive research and development, and a science magnet in high-energy-density (i.e., laser) physics. In addition, most of its special nuclear material would be removed and consolidated at a more central, yet-to-be-named site.

On September 30, 2009, the NNSA announced that about two thirds of the special nuclear material (e.g., plutonium) at LLNL requiring the highest level of security protection had been removed from LLNL. The move was part of NNSA's efforts initiated in October 2006 to consolidate special nuclear material at five sites by 2012, with significantly reduced square footage at those sites by 2017. The federally mandated project intended to improve security and reduce security costs, as part of NNSA's overall effort to transform the Cold War era "nuclear weapons" enterprise into a 21st-century "nuclear security" enterprise. The original date to remove all high-security nuclear material from LLNL, based on equipment capability and capacity, was 2014. NNSA and LLNL then developed a timeline to remove this material earlier, and accelerated the completion date to 2012.

=== Global security program ===
The Lab's work in global security aims to reduce and mitigate the dangers posed by the spread or use of weapons of mass destruction and by threats to energy and environmental security. Livermore has been working on global security and homeland security for decades, predating both the collapse of the Soviet Union in 1991 and the September 11, 2001, terrorist attacks. LLNL staff have been heavily involved in the cooperative nonproliferation programs with Russia to secure at-risk weapons materials and assist former weapons workers in developing peaceful applications and self-sustaining job opportunities for their expertise and technologies. In the mid-1990s, Lab scientists began devising improved biodetection capabilities, leading to miniaturized and autonomous instruments that can detect biothreat agents in a few minutes instead of the days to weeks previously required for DNA analysis.

Livermore researchers address a spectrum of threats – radiological/nuclear, chemical, biological, explosives, and cyber. They combine physical and life sciences, engineering, computations, and analysis to develop technologies that solve real-world problems. Activities are grouped into five programs:

- Nonproliferation. Preventing the spread of materials, technology, and expertise related to weapons of mass destruction (WMD) and detecting WMD proliferation activities worldwide.
- Domestic security: Anticipating, innovating and delivering technological solutions to prevent and mitigate devastating high-leverage attacks on U.S. soil.
- Defense: Developing and demonstrating new concepts and capabilities to help the Department of Defense prevent and deter harm to the nation, its citizens and its military forces.
- Intelligence: Working at the intersection of science, technology, and analysis to provide insight into the threats to national security posed by foreign entities.
- Energy and environmental security: Furnishing scientific understanding and technological expertise to devise energy and environmental solutions at global, regional and local scales.

=== Other programs ===
LLNL supports capabilities in a broad range of scientific and technical disciplines, applying capabilities to existing programs and developing new science and technologies to meet future national needs.

- The LLNL chemistry, materials, and life science research focuses on chemical engineering, nuclear chemistry, materials science, and biology and bio-nanotechnology.
- Physics thrust areas include condensed matter and high-pressure physics, optical science and high energy density physics, medical physics and biophysics, and nuclear, particle and accelerator physics.
- In the area of energy and environmental science, Livermore's emphasis is on carbon and climate, energy, water and the environment, and the national nuclear waste repository.
- The LLNL engineering activities include micro- and nanotechnology, lasers and optics, biotechnology, precision engineering, nondestructive characterization, modeling and simulation, systems and decision science, and sensors, imaging and communications.
- LLNL is a computing organization with capabilities in computer science, software engineering, data science, modeling and simulation, information technology, and cyber security.

Lawrence Livermore National Laboratory has worked out several energy technologies in the field of coal gasification, shale oil extraction, geothermal energy, advanced battery research, solar energy, and fusion energy. Main oil shale processing technologies worked out by the Lawrence Livermore National Laboratory are LLNL HRS (hot-recycled-solid), LLNL RISE (in situ extraction technology) and LLNL radiofrequency technologies.

== Key accomplishments ==
Over its 60-year history, Lawrence Livermore has made many scientific and technological achievements, including:

- Critical contributions to the U.S. nuclear deterrence effort through the design of nuclear weapons to meet military requirements and, since the mid-1980s, through the stockpile stewardship program, by which the safety and reliability of the enduring stockpile is ensured without underground nuclear testing.
- Design, construction, and operation of a series of ever larger, more powerful, and more capable laser systems, culminating in the 192-beam National Ignition Facility (NIF), completed in 2009.
- Advances in particle accelerator and fusion technology, including magnetic fusion, free-electron lasers, accelerator mass spectrometry, and inertial confinement fusion.
- Breakthroughs in high-performance computing, including the development of novel tools for massively parallel computing and the design and application of computers that can carry out quintillions of operations per second.
- Development of technologies and systems for detecting nuclear, radiological, chemical, biological, and explosive threats to prevent and mitigate WMD proliferation and terrorism.
- Development of extreme ultraviolet lithography (EUVL) for fabricating next-generation computer chips.
- First-ever detection of massive compact halo objects (MACHOs), a suspected but previously undetected component of dark matter.
- Advances in genomics, biotechnology, and biodetection, including major contributions to the complete sequencing of the human genome though the Joint Genome Institute and the development of rapid PCR (polymerase chain reaction) technology that lies at the heart of today's most advanced DNA detection instruments.
- Development and operation of the National Atmospheric Release Advisory Center (NARAC), which provides real-time, multi-scale (global, regional, local, urban) modeling of hazardous materials released into the atmosphere.
- Development of highest resolution global climate models and contributions to the Intergovernmental Panel on Climate Change which, together with former vice president Al Gore, was awarded the 2007 Nobel Peace Prize.
- Co-discoverers of new superheavy elements 113, 114, 115, 116, 117, and 118.
- Invention of new healthcare technologies, including a microelectrode array for construction of an artificial retina, a miniature glucose sensor for the treatment of diabetes, and a compact proton therapy system for radiation therapy.

On July 17, 2009 LLNL announced that the Laboratory had received eight R&D 100 Awards – more than it had ever received in the annual competition. The previous LLNL record of seven awards was reached five times – in 1987, 1988, 1997, 1998 and 2006.

Also known as the "Oscars of invention", the awards are given each year for the development of cutting-edge scientific and engineering technologies with commercial potential. The awards raise LLNL's total number of awards since 1978 to 129.

In December, 2022 scientists at Lawrence Livermore National Laboratory announced, in a breakthrough for fusion power technology, that they have used the technique of inertial confinement fusion to achieve a net gain of energy. The National Ignition Facility (NIF) became the first fusion reactor to achieve breakeven on December 5, 2022, with an experiment producing 3.15 megajoules of energy from a 2.05 megajoule input of laser light for an energy gain of about 1.5.

== Key facilities ==
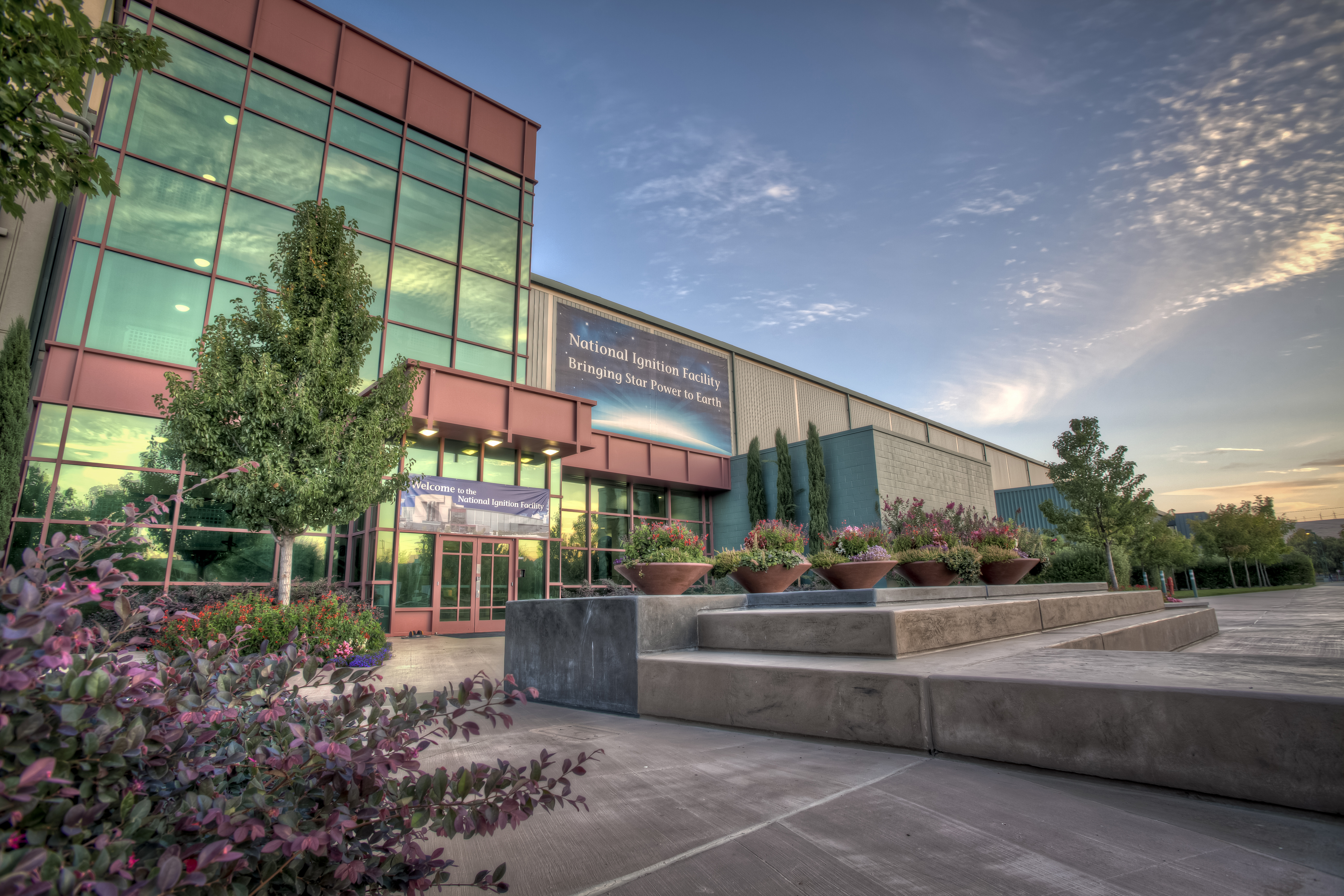
National Ignition Facility

- Biosecurity and Nanoscience Laboratory. Researchers apply advances in nanoscience to develop novel technologies for the detection, identification, and characterization of harmful biological pathogens (viruses, spores, and bacteria) and chemical toxins.
- Center for Accelerator Mass Spectrometry: LLNL's Center for Accelerator Mass Spectrometry (CAMS) develops and applies a wide range of isotopic and ion-beam analytical tools used in basic research and technology development, addressing a spectrum of scientific needs important to the Laboratory, the university community, and the nation. CAMS is the world's most versatile and productive accelerator mass spectrometry facility, performing more than 25,000 AMS measurement operations per year.
- High Explosives Applications Facility and Energetic Materials Center: At HEAF, teams of scientists, engineers, and technicians address nearly all aspects of high explosives: research, development and testing, material characterization, and performance and safety tests. HEAF activities support the Laboratory's Energetic Materials Center, a national resource for research and development of explosives, pyrotechnics, and propellants.
- National Atmospheric Release Advisory Center: NARAC is a national support and resource center for planning, real-time assessment, emergency response, and detailed studies of incidents involving a wide variety of hazards, including nuclear, radiological, chemical, biological, and natural atmospheric emissions.
- National Ignition Facility: This 192-beam, stadium-size laser system is used to compress fusion targets to conditions required for thermonuclear burn. Experiments at NIF study physical processes at conditions that exist only in the interior of stars and in exploding nuclear weapons (see National Ignition Facility and photon science).
- Superblock: This unique high-security facility houses modern equipment for research and engineering testing of nuclear materials and is the place where plutonium expertise is developed, nurtured, and applied. Research on highly enriched uranium also is performed here.
- Livermore Computing Complex: One of the world’s most dominant high performance computing centers, the Livermore Computing Complex comprises several buildings that house many HPC systems that hold top-ranking positions on the Top500 list. LLNL is also home to the world’s largest Spectra TFinity tape library. The complex has nearly 48,000 square feet of machine floor space, supporting both classified and unclassified national security programs. In 2023, LLNL modernized the complex with upgrades to its power and water-cooling capacity.
- Titan Laser: Titan is a combined nanosecond-long pulse and ultrashort-pulse (subpicosecond) laser, with hundreds of joules of energy in each beam. This petawatt-class laser is used for a range of high-energy density physics experiments, including the science of fast ignition for inertial confinement fusion energy.

== Premier computing ecosystem ==
Throughout its history, LLNL has been an early adopter of computers and scientific computing. Even before the Livermore Lab opened its doors, E.O. Lawrence and Edward Teller emphasized the role of computing and the potential of computational simulation. Their purchase of one of the first UNIVAC computers set the precedent for LLNL's history of acquiring and utilising high performance supercomputers. A succession of increasingly powerful and fast computers have been used at the Lab over the years in support of the stockpile stewardship mission. LLNL researchers also use supercomputers to answer questions about subjects such as materials science simulations, climate change, reactions to natural disasters, and other physical phenomena.

LLNL has a long history of developing high performance computing software and systems, focusing on creating highly complex physics models, visualization codes, and other unique applications tailored to specific research requirements. LLNL-developed software projects optimize the operation and management of the computer systems, including operating systems such as NLTSS or TOSS (Tri-Laboratory Operating System Stack), software build and installation tools such as Spack, and resource management packages such as Flux and SLURM. LLNL also initiated and continues leading the development of ZFS on Linux, the official port of ZFS to the Linux operating system.

== Livermore Valley Open Campus (LVOC) ==
In August 2009, a joint venture was announced between Sandia National Laboratories/California campus and LLNL to create an open, unclassified research and development space called the Livermore Valley Open Campus (LVOC). The motivation for the LVOC stems from current and future national security challenges that require increased coupling to the private sector to understand threats and deploy solutions in areas such as high performance computing, energy and environmental security, cyber security, economic security, and non-proliferation.

The LVOC is modeled after research and development campuses found at major industrial research parks and other U.S. Department of Energy laboratories with campus-like security, a set of business and operating rules devised to enhance and accelerate international scientific collaboration and partnerships with U.S. government agencies, industry and academia. Ultimately, the LVOC will consist of an approximately 110-acre parcel along the eastern edge of the Livermore Laboratory and Sandia sites, and will house additional conference space, collaboration facilities and a visitor center to support educational and research activities.

Objectives of LVOC

- Enhance the two laboratories' national security missions by substantially increasing engagement with the private sector and academic community.
- Stay at the forefront of the science, technology and engineering fields.
- Ensure a quality future workforce by expanding opportunities for open engagement of the broader scientific community.

== Sponsors ==
LLNL's principal sponsor is the Department of Energy/National Nuclear Security Administration (DOE/NNSA) Office of Defense Programs, which supports its stockpile stewardship and advanced scientific computing programs. Funding to support LLNL's global security and homeland security work comes from the DOE/NNSA Office of Defense Nuclear Nonproliferation, as well as the Department of Homeland Security. LLNL also receives funding from DOE's Office of Science, Office of Civilian Radioactive Waste Management, and Office of Nuclear Energy. In addition, LLNL conducts work-for-others research and development for various Defense Department sponsors, other federal agencies, including NASA, Nuclear Regulatory Commission (NRC), National Institutes of Health, and Environmental Protection Agency, a number of California State agencies, and private industry.

== Budget ==
For Fiscal Year 2009 LLNL spent $1.497 billion on research and laboratory operations activities:

Research/Science Budget:

- National Ignition Facility – $301.1 million
- Nuclear Weapon Deterrent (Safety/Security/Reliability) – $227.2 million
- Advance Simulation and Computing – $221.9 million
- Nonproliferation – $152.2 million
- Department of Defense – $125.9 million
- Basic and Applied Science – $86.6 million
- Homeland Security – $83.9 million
- Energy – $22.4 million

Site Management/Operations Budget:

- Safeguards/Security – $126.5 million
- Facility Operations – $118.2 million
- Environmental Restoration – $27.3 million

== Directors ==
The LLNL director is appointed by the board of governors of Lawrence Livermore National Security, LLC (LLNS) and reports to the board. The laboratory director also serves as the president of LLNS. Over the course of its history, the following scientists have served as LLNL director:

No.	Image	Director	Term start	Term end	Refs.
1		Herbert York	1952	1958	
2		Edward Teller	1958	1960	
3		Harold Brown	1960	1961	
4		John S. Foster, Jr.	1961	1965	
5		Michael M. May	1965	1971	
6		Roger E. Batzel	1971	1988	
7		John Nuckolls	1988	1994	
8		C. Bruce Tarter	1994	2002	
9		Michael R. Anastasio	July 1, 2002	March 14, 2006	
interim		George H. Miller	March 15, 2006	September 30, 2007	
10		George H. Miller	October 1, 2007	November 30, 2011	
11		Penrose C. Albright	December 1, 2011	October 31, 2013	
acting		Bret Knapp	November 1, 2013	March 26, 2014	
12		William H. Goldstein	March 27, 2014	March 1, 2021	
13		Kimberly S. Budil	March 2, 2021	present	

== Organization ==
The LLNL director is supported by a senior executive team consisting of the deputy director, the deputy director for science and technology, principal associate directors, and other senior executives who manage areas/functions directly reporting to the laboratory director.

The director's office is organized into these functional areas/offices:

- Chief Information Office
- Contractor Assurance and Continuous Improvement
- Environment, Safety and Health
- Government and External Relations
- Independent Audit and Oversight
- Office of General Counsel
- Prime Contract Management Office
- Quality Assurance Office
- Security Organization
- LLNS, LLC Parent Oversight Office

The laboratory is organized into four principal directorates, each headed by a principal associate director:

- Global Security
- Weapons and Complex Integration
- National Ignition Facility and Photon Science
- Operations and Business
  - Business
  - Facilities & Infrastructure
  - Institutional Facilities Management
  - Integrated Safety Management System Project Office
  - Nuclear Operations
  - Planning and Financial Management
  - Staff Relations
  - Strategic Human Resources Management

Three other directorates are each headed by a principal associate director who reports to the LLNL director:

- Computing
- Engineering
- Physical & Life Sciences

== Corporate management ==
The LLNL director reports to the Lawrence Livermore National Security, LLC (LLNS) board of governors, a group of key scientific, academic, national security and business leaders from the LLNS partner companies that jointly own and control LLNS. The LLNS board of governors has a total of 16 positions, with six of these governors constituting an executive committee. All decisions of the board are made by the governors on the executive committee. The other governors are advisory to the executive committee and do not have voting rights.

The University of California is entitled to appoint three governors to the executive committee, including the chair. Bechtel is also entitled to appoint three governors to the executive committee, including the vice chair. One of the Bechtel governors must be a representative of Babcock & Wilcox (B&W) or the Washington Division of URS Corporation (URS), who is nominated jointly by B&W and URS each year, and who must be approved and appointed by Bechtel. The executive committee has a seventh governor who is appointed by Battelle; they are non-voting and advisory to the executive committee. The remaining board positions are known as independent governors (also referred to as outside governors), and are selected from among individuals, preferably of national stature, and can not be employees or officers of the partner companies.

The University of California-appointed chair has tie-breaking authority over most decisions of the executive committee. The board of governors is the ultimate governing body of LLNS and is charged with overseeing the affairs of LLNS in its operations and management of LLNL.

LLNS managers and employees who work at LLNL, up to and including the president and laboratory director, are generally referred to as laboratory employees. All laboratory employees report directly or indirectly to the LLNS president. While most of the work performed by LLNL is funded by the federal government, laboratory employees are paid by LLNS, which is responsible for all aspects of their employment, including providing health care benefits and retirement programs.

Within the board of governors, authority resides in the executive committee to exercise all rights, powers, and authorities of LLNS, excepting only certain decisions that are reserved to the parent companies. The LLNS executive committee is free to appoint officers or other managers of LLNS and LLNL, and may delegate its authorities as it deems appropriate to such officers, employees, or other representatives of LLNS/LLNL. The executive committee may also retain auditors, attorneys, or other professionals as necessary. For the most part the executive committee has appointed senior managers at LLNL as the primary officers of LLNS. As a practical matter most operational decisions are delegated to the president of LLNS, who is also the laboratory director. The positions of president laboratory director and deputy laboratory director are filled by joint action of the chair and vice chair of the executive committee, with the University of California nominating the president and laboratory director and Bechtel nominating the deputy laboratory director.

The current LLNS chairman is Norman J. Pattiz, founder and chairman of Westwood One, America's largest radio network, who also currently serves on the board of regents of the University of California. The vice chairman is J. Scott Ogilvie, president of Bechtel Systems & Infrastructure, Inc., who also serves on the board of directors of Bechtel Group, Inc. (BGI) and on the BGI Audit Committee.

== Public protests ==
The Livermore Action Group organized many mass protests, from 1981 to 1984, against nuclear weapons which were being produced by the Lawrence Livermore National Laboratory. Peace activists Ken Nightingale and Eldred Schneider were involved. On June 22, 1982, more than 1,300 anti-nuclear protesters were arrested in a nonviolent demonstration. More recently, there has been an annual protest against nuclear weapons research at Lawrence Livermore. In August 2003, 1,000 people protested at Livermore Labs against "new-generation nuclear warheads". In the 2007 protest, 64 people were arrested. More than 80 people were arrested in March 2008 while protesting at the gates.

On July 27, 2021, the Society of Professionals, Scientists, and Engineers – University of Professional & Technical Employees Local 11, CWA Local 9119, went on a three-day strike over unfair labor practices.

== See also ==
- Center for the Advancement of Science in Space—operates the US National Laboratory on the ISS
- Dielectric wall accelerator
- Lawrence Berkeley National Laboratory
- List of US DOE National Laboratories
- Top 100 US Federal Contractors

== Bibliography ==
- Tarter, C. Bruce (2018). The American lab: an insider's history of the Lawrence Livermore National Laboratory. Baltimore: Johns Hopkins University Press. ISBN 978-1421425313.
- Gusterson, Hugh (1996). Nuclear Rites: A Weapons Laboratory at the End of the Cold War. Berkeley: University of California Press. ISBN 0-520-21373-4.
- The Stockpile Stewardship and Management Program: Maintaining Confidence in the Safety and Reliability of the Enduring U.S. Nuclear Weapon Stockpile (Report). U.S. Department of Energy, Office of Defense Programs. May 1995.
- de Vore, Lauren, ed. (1992). Preparing for the 21st Century: 40 Years of Excellence (Report). Lawrence Livermore National Laboratory. UCRL-AR-108618.
