= Wireless Communications and Public Safety Act =

Wireless Communications and Public Safety Act of 1999
- Other short titles: 911 Act
- Long title: An act to promote public safety through the deployment of a seamless, nationwide emergency communications infrastructure that includes wireless communications services.
- Enacted by: the 106th United States Congress

Citations
- Public law: Pub. L. 106–81 (text) (PDF)

Legislative history
- Introduced in the House as H.R. 438 by Rep. John Shimkus [R-IL] on February 2, 1999; Signed into law by President Bill Clinton on October 26, 1999

The Wireless Communications and Public Safety Act of 1999, also known as the 911 Act, is a United States federal law enacted as Public Law 106–81 of October 26, 1999. The act required the setup of enhanced 911 and mandated that 911 serve as the emergency number for non-land line phones as well. It was an amendment to the Communications Act of 1934 as amended by the Telecommunications Act of 1996.

== House ==
The Wireless Communications and Public Safety Act began as H.R. 438 in the 106th Congress. The purpose of the bill was "To promote and enhance public safety through use of 911 as the universal emergency assistance number, and for other purposes." It was introduced February 2, 1999 by Rep. John Shimkus [R-IL]. There were six bi-partisan co-sponsors: Roy Blunt [R-MO], Nathan Deal [R-GA], Anna Eshoo [D-CA], Thomas Sawyer [D-OH], Billy Tauzin [R-LA], and Heather Wilson [R-NM].

The bill was referred to the following committees: House Commerce Committee (where the bill text was revised and reported out) and then House Commerce Subcommittee on Telecommunications, Trade, and Consumer Protection (where hearings were held, the bill text revised and reported out). The bill was finally reported out February 11, 1999.

The bill went up to vote on February 24, 1999. One amendment was made to the bill, House Amendment 8, and amendment made in order as an original bill for the purpose of amendment pursuant to the rule. This amendment was voted on and passed the same day.

The bill came to a final vote on February 24, 1999. The bill passed with 415 Ayes, 2 Nays, and 16 present/ not voting. The only 2 Nays were Helen Chenoweth-Hage [R-ID] and Ron Paul [R-TX].

== Senate ==
The Wireless Communications and Public Safety Act moved from the House and was presented in the Senate on April 14, 1999 as S.800. The bill was sponsored by Senator Conrad Burns [MT], and co-sponsored by 15 senators:

- Sen. Abraham, Spencer (MI)
- Sen. Allard, Wayne (CO)
- Sen. Ashcroft, John (MO)
- Sen. Breaux, John B. (LA)
- Sen. Brownback, Sam (KS)
- Sen. Chafee, John H. (RI)
- Sen. Dorgan, Byron L. (ND)
- Sen. Feingold, Russell D. (WI)
- Sen. Frist, William H. (TN)
- Sen. Grams, Rod (MN)
- Sen. Kerry, John F. (MA)
- Sen. Lott, Trent (MS)
- Sen. Mack, Connie, III (FL)
- Sen. McCain, John (AZ)
- Sen. Wyden, Ron (OR)

The bill was presented to committee on May 12 where hearings were held in the Committee on Commerce, Science, and Transportation Subcommittee on Communications. On June 23, the Committee on Commerce ordered the bill to be reported favorably with their added amendments. August 4 the bill was given to Senator John McCain, who placed it on the senate legislative calendar. The next day, August 5, the bill passed with unanimous consent.

September 8, the bill was received back in the House with a message on Senate action. It was held at the desk with no further immediate action. The following month on October 12, Rep. Tauzin moved to pass the bill. Following forty minutes of debate, a roll call was taken and the vote passed 424–2.

Two days later on October 14, the bill was presented to President Clinton. He signed the bill into law October 26, 1999, known as Public Law No: 106-81.

== Summary ==
The 911 Act was enacted on October 26, 1999 to enhance public safety by encouraging and facilitating the prompt deployment of a nationwide, seamless communications infrastructure for emergency services that includes wireless communications. To ensure a comprehensive approach to emergency service throughout the country, the 911 Act directs the FCC to make 911 the universal emergency number for wireline and wireless telephone service and to establish appropriate transition periods for areas in which 911 is not in use as an emergency telephone number on the date of enactment of the 911 Act. It further directs the FCC to encourage and support the States in developing comprehensive emergency communications throughout the United States so that all jurisdictions offer seamless networks for prompt emergency service.

Wireless Communications and Public Safety Act of 1999 - Amends the Communications Act of 1934 to direct the Federal Communications Commission (FCC) and any agency or entity to which the FCC delegates such authority to designate 911 as the universal emergency telephone number within the United States for reporting an emergency to appropriate authorities and requesting assistance. Applies such designation to both wireline and wireless telephone service. Directs the FCC to provide appropriate transition periods for areas in which 911 is not currently an emergency number.

Requires the FCC to encourage and support efforts by States to deploy comprehensive end-to-end emergency communications infrastructure and programs based on coordinated statewide plans. Requires appropriate consultation with regard to such deployment.

Provides immunity from liability, to the same extent as provided to local telephone exchange companies, for providers of wireless service. Provides immunity for users of wireless 911 service to the same extent as provided to users of 911 service that is not wireless. Provides immunity for public safety answering points (emergency dispatchers).

Authorizes telecommunications carriers to provide call location information concerning a user of a commercial mobile service to: (1) emergency dispatchers and emergency service personnel in order to respond to the user's call; (2) the user's legal guardian or family member in an emergency situation that involves the risk of death or serious physical harm; or (3) providers of information or data base management services solely for assisting in the delivery of emergency services. Requires a customer's express prior authorization for disclosure to any other person. Requires telephone exchange service providers to provide both listed and unlisted subscriber information to providers of emergency and emergency support services.

== See also ==
- Department of Public Safety
