= Oregon Department of Public Safety Standards and Training =

Agency overview
- Formed: 1961
- Preceding agency: Board on Police Standards and Training (BPST)
- Jurisdiction: Oregon
- Headquarters: Salem, Oregon
- Website: Oregon DPSST

The Oregon Department of Public Safety Standards and Training (DPSST) is an agency of the government of the U.S. state of Oregon responsible for establishing and enforcing minimum standards and providing training for public safety officers and staff, including law enforcement and fire fighting personnel within the state. It operates a central academy in Salem, Oregon and conducts or certifies field training programs throughout the state.

In 1961, the Board on Police Standards and Training (BPST) was created by the Oregon Legislative Assembly and signed into law by Governor Mark Hatfield. The action was taken in part in response to the work of the Oregon-Washington Lawman's Association, a voluntary coalition of police professionals formed to address a need its members saw for more rigorous qualifications for Oregon law enforcement officers. In 1968, the Board's certification and training standards were made mandatory. Over the years the department's program was expanded to include both sworn and classified personnel at every level of service in the law enforcement and fire protection professions. Its central academy was opened in March, 1988.

== See also ==
- Department of Public Safety
