= Kimberly S. Budil =

American physicist

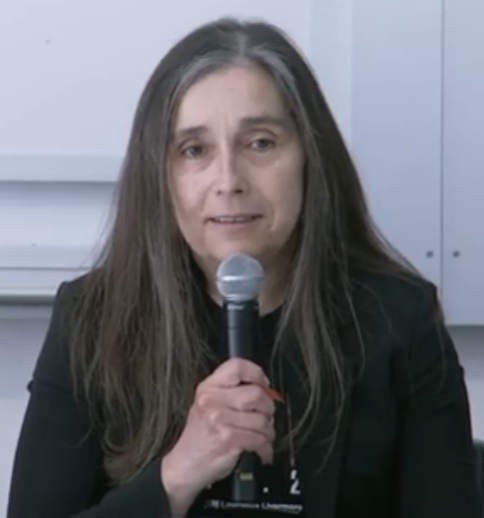
- At the 2023 panel discussion "Breakthroughs in Fusion"

13th Director of the Lawrence Livermore National Laboratory
- Incumbent
- Assumed office March 2, 2021
- President: Joe Biden
- Preceded by: William H. Goldstein
- Scientific career
- Education: University of Illinois Chicago (BS); University of California, Davis (MS, PhD)
- Fields: High powered lasers
- Workplaces: Lawrence Livermore National Laboratory; University of California
- Thesis: High order harmonic generation in rare gases (1994)
- Doctoral advisor: Ann Orel

Kimberly Susan Budil is an American physicist who is the 13th and current director of Lawrence Livermore National Laboratory, making her the first woman to hold this position. She completed her bachelor's degree in physics from the University of Illinois Chicago, and her master's and doctorate in applied science from the University of California, Davis. She collaborated with Nobel laureate Donna Strickland, and made significant contributions to the field of high-power, ultra-fast lasers. Starting her career at Lawrence Livermore National Laboratory in 1987, she held various roles across government departments, including the Department of Energy and the Department of Defense. In 2014, she managed relations between the University of California's campuses and the three Department of Energy labs it manages. Budil, who was made a fellow of the American Physical Society in 2019, has also been a prominent advocate for women in science.

== Education and career ==
Budil received a bachelor of science with a major in physics in 1987 from the University of Illinois Chicago, and a master of science in 1988 and a doctor of philosophy in 1994, both in applied science from the University of California, Davis.

While in graduate school, she worked with future Nobel laureate Donna Strickland, who told her about her impostor syndrome. Strickand said, "Stop apologizing for being here – you belong and you are contributing in a real way." She shared her experience and what she learned from it in a book "Find Your Path: Unconventional Lessons from 36 Leading Scientists and Engineers", together with other contributors such as Stephon Alexander. Her main scientific contribution was in the field of high-power, ultra-fast lasers, participating in the NOVA project, the first inertial confinement fusion project in the world and the predecessor of the National Ignition Facility.

After joining Lawrence Livermore National Laboratory as a scientist in 1987 and later as a postdoc in 1994, she assumed various roles at a wide variety of United States government entities such as the National Nuclear Security Administration, the Department of Homeland Security, the Department of Defense, and the Department of Energy.

In 2014, she became the University of California vice-president for laboratory management, managing relations between the ten campuses and the three Department of Energy labs managed by the University of California (Lawrence Berkeley National Laboratory, Lawrence Livermore National Laboratory and Los Alamos National Laboratory). In 2019, she was principal associate director for Weapons & Complex Integration at LLNL.

In 2019, she was made a fellow of the American Physical Society.

In 2021, she was named as the director of Lawrence Livermore National Laboratory, becoming the first woman to hold the position.

In 2026, she was elected a member of the National Academy of Engineering for "advancing nuclear deterrence through technical contributions, laboratory leadership, and advice to the government".

== Science advocacy ==
Budil has been an early advocate for women in science. She participated in the Lawrence Livermore Laboratory Women's Association and organized numerous technical women's conferences, and she later contributed to international panels such as the American Physical Society's Committee on the Status of Women in Physics.
