= Ann Orel =

American physical chemist (born 1955)

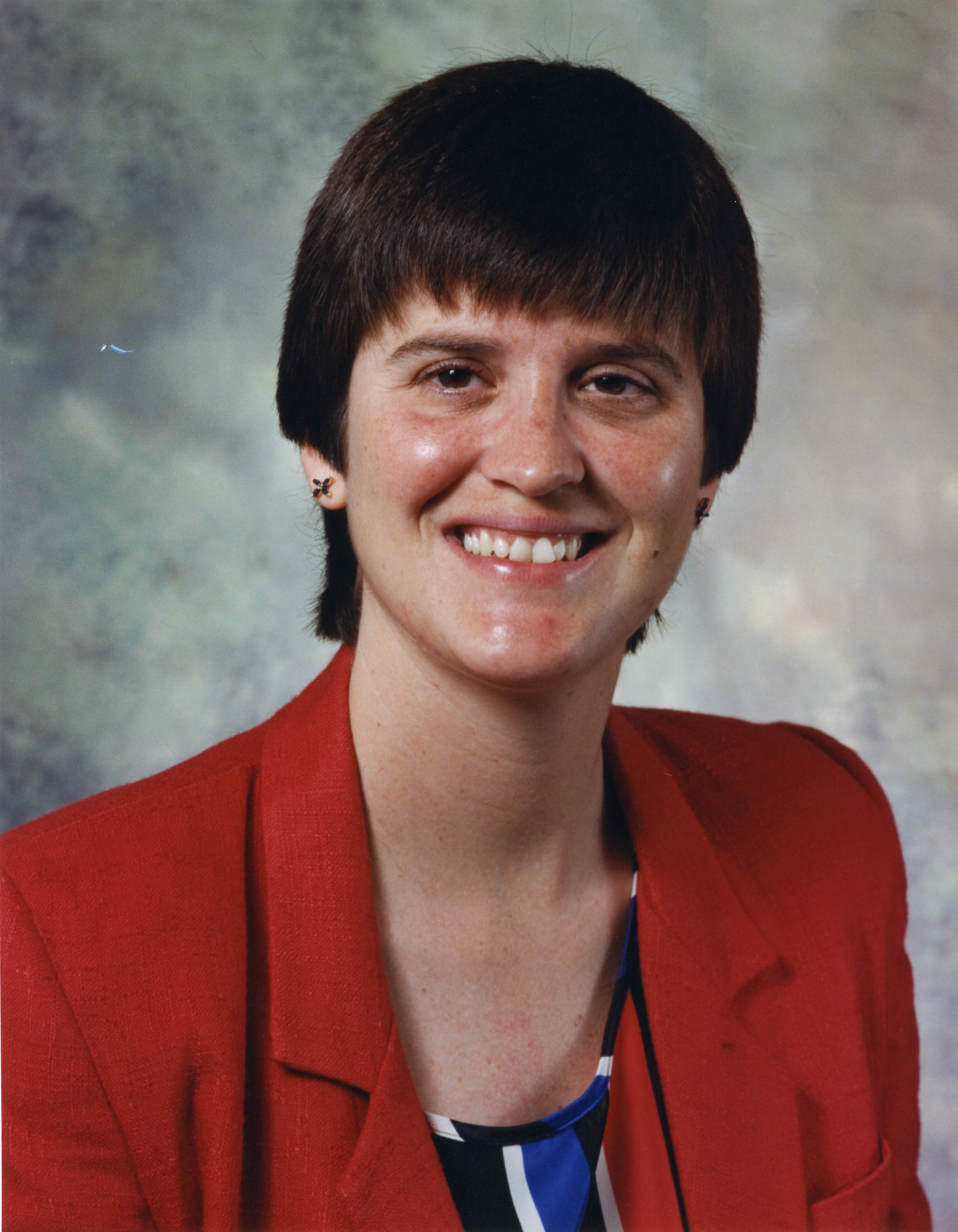
- Orel in 2012
- Education: California Institute of Technology (BS); University of California, Berkeley (PhD)
- Scientific career
- Fields: Physical chemistry Laser chemistry
- Workplaces: Lawrence Berkeley National Laboratory; University of California, Davis
- Thesis: Laser induced chemical reactions (1981)
- Doctoral advisor: William Hughes Miller
- Doctoral students: Kimberly S. Budil

Ann E. Orel is an American physical chemist and computational scientist who is Professor Emerita in chemical engineering at the University of California, Davis, and is affiliated with the Ultrafast X-Ray Science Laboratory at Lawrence Berkeley National Laboratory. She has published research in theoretical atomic and molecular physics and computational methods for molecular dynamics and electron scattering. In 2000, she was named a Fellow of the American Physical Society.

== Education ==
Orel earned a BS in chemistry from the California Institute of Technology in 1977 followed by a Ph.D. in chemistry from the University of California, Berkeley, in 1981.

== Career ==
Orel served on the faculty at the University of California, Davis, including in leadership roles in the Department of Applied Sciences. She is listed as Professor Emerita in the UC Davis Department of Chemical Engineering.

Orel is also listed as a member of the theory group/people roster of the Ultrafast X-Ray Science Laboratory at Lawrence Berkeley National Laboratory.

== Research ==
UC Davis describes Orel’s work as using wave packet methods (numerical solutions of the time-dependent Schrödinger equation) for molecular dynamics, and the Complex Kohn variational method for electron scattering calculations.

== Service and professional activities ==
Orel has served in elected or appointed roles within the American Physical Society, including listing as a General Councillor in APS governance materials.

In 2007, she criticized vague and inconsistently applied grant-review expectations as potentially counterproductive for early-career scientists and noted that women in physics could be treated as contributing to diversity “by existing.”

== Honors and recognition ==
- 1980 – Anna Louise Hoffman Award for Outstanding Achievement in Graduate Research
- Fellow of the American Physical Society
