= Florida Public Safety Information Act =

1997 Florida law

Florida Public Safety Information Act was passed in 1997 in Florida to list sexual predators and sexual offenders on the internet and to make the same information available through a 24-hour/day hotline.

== Internet access ==
FDLE maintains a secure internet connection to the sexual offender/predator database for all criminal justice agencies that have CJNET capabilities. Viewing and limited editing/write access directly to the state Sex Offender Database (through CJNet) to law enforcement agencies submitting address verification and field intelligence information. Training on sexual predator and offenders laws and relevant Florida procedures and systems is provided.

== Hardcopy assistance ==
FDLE provides all sheriffs' offices and FDLE regional operations centers with sexual predator/ offender registration forms and will make available by diskette, electronic (through CJNET) or hardcopy format, model affidavits and warrants for all offenses regarding sexual offenders and predators. The department also will make available to all criminal justice agencies in the county where the sexual predator is going to reside a camera-ready copy of a flyer that may be used for community notification.

== Collaboration with local law enforcement ==
Upon request, FDLE will provide all collected modus operandi (MO) information on sexual predators to local law enforcement agencies for investigations and analysis of patterns or actions used in abduction and/or sexual offenses previously committed by the predators.

== DNA registry ==
The FDLE will coordinate with the Florida Department of Corrections to help ensure that DNA samples on all sexual predators are available to assist agencies in investigating and prosecuting cases.

== Offender locating and residence ==
The department will actively participate in locating and arresting sexual predators and sex offenders who are not residing at the street address they have provided. When FDLE is notified that an offender is not at the location, FDLE will add to the remarks field in the sexual predator/sex offender status record that the reported address does not appear to be correct and, when appropriate, will move to obtain a warrant for the sexual predator or sex offender's arrest. FDLE will continue to work cooperatively with local law enforcement to fully effect this strategy.

== Analysis and intel ==
FDLE will provide analysis and intelligence to assist local agencies in solving crimes that are sexual offenses, particularly where there is a possibility that a sexual predator/or sexual offender is involved.

== Interstate cooperation ==
FDLE makes Florida sexual predator and sexual offender information available to other states by providing access to the hot file status records on these persons and by submitting information on these persons to the National Sex Offender Registry. FDLE provides the ability for local law enforcement agencies to access sexual predator information in other states. These are accomplished through the National Law Enforcement Telecommunications System (NLETS).

== Inter-agency cooperation ==
FDLE will serve as a member of interdepartmental teams and task forces if so requested by local authorities and makes resources available to respond to the needs of the criminal justice community and the public in regard to sexual predators/offenders. This includes, as necessary, crime laboratory services, investigative services and informational services.

== Address verification ==
FDLE conducts regular mail-outs to all registered sexual offenders and predators who are no longer under sanction to verify registration requirements have been complies with. Results from these mail-outs are available to local law enforcement agencies and FDLE regional offices through the CJNet and the Sexual Offender Predator Unit to facilitate efforts in identifying and ascertaining the location of any offender or predator who has failed to comply with registration requirements and seeking any necessary warrants or legal action.

== Tracking and mapping ==
FDLE offers Florida law enforcement agencies a geo-mapping system that tracks sexual offenders and predators within their jurisdictions. Additionally, geo-mapping applications can be expanded to include automated community mail notifications and other helpful tools. Several agencies have already established effective geo-mapping practices within their agencies for the purposes of community notification and analysis. Analysis may include weekly updated locator graphs of addresses and new predators, along with crime trend information for investigative purposes.

== The general public ==
FDLE will make certain information on Florida sexual predators and sexual offenders readily available to the public by posting the predators/offenders registration information and their photographs on the internet, maintaining a toll-free telephone line for the public to use to inquire whether an individual is a sexual predator or sexual offender, and making informational flyers and brochures on sexual predators and sexual offenders available to the public.

== Sources ==
- Florida Department of Law Enforcement

== See also ==
- Department of Public Safety
