= Department of public safety =

Type of state or local government umbrella agency in the United States

In the United States, a Department of Public Safety is a state or local government agency that often has a broad portfolio of responsibilities, which may include some or all of the following:

- Fire services: provides fire prevention and suppression.
- Rescue services: provides rescue services.
- Haz-mat services: provides hazardous materials response.
- Ambulance
- Policing services: provides law enforcement, community policing and outreach.
- Emergency communications: operates the public interface emergency communications telephone system by providing the 9-1-1 and Enhanced 911 emergency telephone numbers.
- Office of Emergency Management (OEM): plans for and operates the emergency operations center during calamities, disasters, special events, and emergencies.
- Inspections and code enforcement: usually building safety, which includes construction, electrical et al., and vehicle inspections.
- Animal control: this category could also include wildlife officers, game wardens, and dog catchers.
- Department of Motor Vehicles (DMV): includes administration of driver's licenses, license plates and identification cards.
- Department of Transportation (DOT): includes vehicle registration, tags, and license plates.

These responsibilities are usually organized into separate agencies under a DPS due to their diversity, though there is a critical exception in certain local jurisdictions (as further explained below).

In other countries, equivalent agencies may be known as the ministry of the interior. In U.S. state or local governments that do not have a DPS, equivalent agencies may be known as the department of emergency services.

== United States ==
=== Federal level ===
The United States Department of Homeland Security is the federal-level department of public safety of the United States, which is responsible for federal supervision of emergency services for major disasters through the Federal Emergency Management Agency (FEMA).

=== State and territorial level ===
In state governments in the United States, the DPS is often a law enforcement agency synonymous with the state police. At local and special district levels, they may be all-encompassing. Examples of states having these include Texas, Minnesota, Tennessee, Arizona, Alabama, Oklahoma, and South Carolina. In many states, the state police may be a subdivision of the DPS and not its independent department.

==== List of state and territorial departments of public safety ====
- Alabama Department of Public Safety
- Alaska Department of Public Safety
- American Samoa Department of Public Safety
- Arkansas Department of Public Safety
- Arizona Department of Public Safety
- Colorado Department of Public Safety
- Connecticut Department of Public Safety
- Delaware State Police
- Florida Department of Law Enforcement
- Georgia Department of Public Safety
- Hawaii Department of Public Safety
- Iowa Department of Public Safety
- Kentucky Justice and Public Safety Cabinet
- Louisiana Department of Public Safety
- Maine Department of Public Safety
- Maryland Department of Public Safety and Correctional Services
- Massachusetts Executive Office of Public Safety and Security
- Minnesota Department of Public Safety
- Missouri Department of Public Safety
- Mississippi Department of Public Safety
- New Jersey Department of Law and Public Safety
- New Hampshire Department of Safety
- New Mexico Department of Public Safety
- Nevada Department of Public Safety
- North Carolina Department of Crime Control and Public Safety
- North Dakota Department of Public Safety
- Ohio Department of Public Safety
- Oklahoma Department of Public Safety
- Oregon Department of Public Safety Standards and Training
- Puerto Rico Department of Public Safety
- Rhode Island Department of Public Safety
- South Carolina Department of Public Safety
- South Dakota Department of Safety
- Tennessee Department of Safety and Homeland Security
- Texas Department of Public Safety
- Utah Department of Public Safety
- Vermont Department of Public Safety
- Virginia Secretariat of Public Safety and Homeland Security
- West Virginia Department of Military Affairs and Public Safety

=== Local level ===
Many local jurisdictions (cities and counties), and special districts (schools and hospitals) have the umbrella configuration described above, in which the DPS is simply a joint administration of several distinct agencies. They may share administrative support staff and back-office functions, but sworn personnel remain specialized and have particular responsibilities (that is, the police continue to arrest people and the firefighters put out fires). The DPS of Cobb County, Georgia is one example.

However, a minority of jurisdictions have departments of public safety that have primary and direct responsibility for all emergencies. In these unusual organizations, all full-time sworn personnel are cross-trained as police officers, firefighters and EMTs, and can respond to emergencies in any capacity. Although it is more expensive to hire, train and retain such personnel, they have a clear advantage in terms of their flexibility. They can respond as first responders to many rapidly evolving situations rather than waiting for the arrival of other specialized personnel.

This configuration was more widely popular in the 1970s and 1980s in the United States but has since gone out of style because relatively few cities have been able to execute it successfully because of manpower limitations in handling major incidents.

In a few California cities (the San Gabriel Valley city of Duarte, for example), the Department of Public Safety usually is restricted to code enforcement officers or animal control service agents (especially when those cities contract out for law enforcement with the county sheriff's office).

==== List of cities with departments of public safety with fully cross-trained personnel ====
Alaska

- Hoonah Department of Public Safety
- Ted Stevens Anchorage International Airport Department of Public Safety
- Fairbanks International Airport Department of Public Safety

California

- Rohnert Park Department of Public Safety Park Fire Police
- Sunnyvale Department of Public Safety Fire Police

Florida

- Daytona Beach Shores Department of Public Safety
- Indian River Shores Public Safety Department
- Jupiter Island Public Safety Department

Georgia

- Bainbridge Department of Public Safety
- Grovetown Department of Public Safety
- Social Circle Department of Public Safety

Illinois

- Glencoe Department of Public Safety
- Rosemont Department of Public Safety

Indiana

- Whitestown Department of Public Safety
- Fort Wayne International Airport Department of Public Safety

Iowa

- Cedar Falls Department of Public Safety
- Nevada Department of Public Safety
- Eastern Iowa Airport Department of Public Safety

Kansas

- Augusta Department of Public Safety

Kentucky

- Prestonsburg Department of Public Safety

Michigan

- Albion Department of Public Safety
- Berkley Department of Public Safety
- Beverly Hills Department of Public Safety
- Blackman Township Department of Public Safety
- Bloomfield Hills Department of Public Safety
- Capital Region Airport Authority Department of Public Safety
- Centerline Department of Public Safety
- Cheboygan Department of Public Safety
- East Grand Rapids Department of Public Safety
- Emmett Township Department of Public Safety
- Escanaba Department of Public Safety
- Essexville Department of Public Safety
- Farmington Department of Public Safety
- Flint Bishop Airport Authority Department of Public Safety
- Fraser Department of Public Safety
- Gladstone Department of Public Safety
- Grand Haven Department of Public Safety
- Greenville Department of Public Safety
- Grosse Pointe Department of Public Safety
- Grosse Pointe Farms Department of Public Safety
- Grosse Pointe Park Department of Public Safety
- Grosse Pointe Shores Department of Public Safety
- Grosse Pointe Woods Department of Public Safety
- Hampton Township Department of Public Safety
- Harper Woods Department of Public Safety
- Huntington Woods Department of Public Safety
- Ionia Department of Public Safety
- Ironwood Department of Public Safety
- Kalamazoo Department of Public Safety (claims to be the largest, with about 380 sworn personnel)
- Kingsford Department of Public Safety
- Manistique Department of Public Safety
- Monroe Department of Public Safety
- Oak Park Department of Public Safety
- Petoskey Department of Public Safety
- Plainwell Department of Public Safety
- Rockford Department of Public Safety
- Springfield Department of Public Safety
- St. Joseph Department of Public Safety

Minnesota

- Mankato Department of Public Safety
- New Brighton Department of Public Safety
- Woodbury Department of Public Safety

Missouri

- Des Peres Department of Public Safety
- Maryville Department of Public Safety
- Sikeston Department of Public Safety
- Mexico Public Safety Department
- St. Louis Department of Public Safety

North Carolina

- Asheville Regional Airport
- Bald Head Island Public Safety
- Butner Public Safety
- Morganton Public Safety

New Hampshire

- Waterville Valley Department of Public Safety

Oregon

- Grants Pass Department of Public Safety

Ohio

- Amberley Village Department of Public Safety
- Oakwood Public Safety Department

South Carolina

- Aiken Department of Public Safety
- Cayce Department of Public Safety
- Clinton Public Safety Department
- North Augusta Department of Public Safety
- Orangeburg Department of Public Safety
- Spartanburg Public Safety Department
- Union Public Safety Department
- Winnsboro Department of Public Safety

Tennessee

- Church Hill Department of Public Safety
- Jonesborough Department of Public Safety
- Kingston Springs Department of Public Safety
- Lookout Mountain Police and Fire Department
- Nashville International Airport Department of Public Safety
- Norris Department of Public Safety
- Waverly Department of Public Safety

Texas

- Dalworthington Gardens Department of Public Safety
- Fate Department of Public Safety
- Health Department of Public Safety
- Highland Park Department of Public Safety
- Oak Point Department of Public Safety
- Southlake Department of Public Safety
- Woodway Public Safety Department

Wisconsin

- Ashwaubenon Department of Public Safety
- Palmyra Public Safety

==== Departments of public safety without cross-trained personnel ====
Alabama

- Daleville Department of Public Safety
- Livingston Department of Public Safety

California

- Norwalk Department of Public Safety

Colorado

- Denver Department of Public Safety

New York

- Co-op City Department of Public Safety
- Hunts Point Department of Public Safety
- Parkchester Department of Public Safety
- Westchester County Department of Public Safety
- Cayuga Community College Department of Public Safety
- Syracuse University Department of Public Safety
- New York University Department of Public Safety
- City University of New York Public Safety Department in 26 universities
- Sea gate Public Safety Department

South Carolina

- North Myrtle Beach Department of Public Safety (cross-trained until 2021)

Washington

- Steilacoom Department of Public Safety

== See also ==
- Coalition for Effective Public Safety
- Commissioner of Public Safety
- Commissioner of Public Affairs and Public Safety
- CUNY Public Safety Department (Peace Officers)
- Effective Safety Training
- Florida Public Safety Information Act
- Justice and Public Safety Practitioner
- Los Angeles County Office of Public Safety
- Interior ministry
- National Safety Council
- National Atmospheric Release Advisory Center
- Office of Public Safety
- Oregon Department of Public Safety Standards and Training
- Public-safety answering point
- Public Safety Officer Medal of Valor
- Wireless Communications and Public Safety Act
- Public Safety Employer-Employee Cooperation Act of 2007
