= National Atmospheric Release Advisory Center =

The National Atmospheric Release Advisory Center (NARAC) is located at the University of California's Lawrence Livermore National Laboratory. It is a national support and resource center for planning, real-time assessment, emergency response, and detailed studies of incidents involving a wide variety of hazards, including nuclear, radiological, chemical, biological, and natural emissions.

NARAC provides tools and services to federal, state and local governments, that map the probable spread of hazardous material accidentally or intentionally released into the atmosphere.

NARAC provides atmospheric plume predictions in time for an emergency manager to decide if protective action is necessary to protect the health and safety of people in affected areas.

== The NARAC facility includes ==
- Scientific and technical staff who provide support and training for NARAC tools, as well as quality assurance and detailed analysis of atmospheric releases.
- 24 hour x 7 day on-duty or on-call staff.
- Training facility.
- An Operations Center with uninterruptible power, backup power generators, and robust computer systems.
- Links to over 100 emergency operations centers on the U.S.
- A team of research and operational staff with expertise in atmospheric research, operational meteorology, numerical modeling, computer science, software engineering, geographical information systems, computer graphics, hazardous material (radiological, chemical, biological) properties and effects.

== The Emergency Response System: Real time dispersion modeling ==
The NARAC emergency response central modeling system consists of an integrated suite of meteorological and atmospheric dispersion models. The meteorological data assimilation model, ADAPT, constructs fields of such variables as the mean winds, pressure, precipitation, temperature, and turbulence. Non-divergent wind fields are produced by a procedure based on the variational principle and a finite-element discretization. The dispersion model, LODI, solves the 3-D advection-diffusion equation using a Lagrangian stochastic, Monte Carlo method. LODI includes methods for simulating the processes of mean wind advection, turbulent diffusion, radioactive decay and production, bio-agent degradation, first-order chemical reactions, wet deposition, gravitational settling, dry deposition, and buoyant/momentum plume rise.

The models are coupled to NARAC databases providing topography, geographical data, chemical-biological-nuclear agent properties and health risk levels, real-time meteorological observational data, and global and mesoscale forecast model predictions. The NARAC modeling system also includes an in-house version of the Naval Research Laboratory's mesoscale weather forecast model COAMPS.

== See also ==
- Materials MASINT
- Accidental release source terms
- Air Resources Laboratory
- Air Quality Modeling Group
- Atmospheric dispersion modeling
- Department of Public Safety
- National Center for Atmospheric Research
- University Corporation for Atmospheric Research

== External links and sources ==
- National Atmospheric Release Advisory Center (official website)
- Lawrence Livermore National Laboratory (official website)
