= Kalamazoo Department of Public Safety =

- Abbreviation: KDPS

Agency overview
- Formed: 1983
- Superseding agency: Kalamazoo Police Department and Kalamazoo Fire Department
- Employees: 257 (sworn officers)

Jurisdictional structure
- Operations jurisdiction: Michigan, USA
- Location of Kalamazoo within Kalamazoo County, Michigan
- Area: 25.11 sq mi (65.03 sq km)
- Population: 74,262 (2010)
- Legal jurisdiction: Kalamazoo, MI
- General nature: Local civilian police

Operational structure
- Headquarters: 150 E. Crosstown Kalamazoo, MI
- Agency executive: David Boysen, Chief

Facilities
- Stations: 6

Website
- KDPS Website

The Kalamazoo Department of Public Safety (KDPS) is the department charged with police, fire and rescue operations in Kalamazoo, Michigan. It is the largest public safety department in the nation, with over 250 sworn officers. Each officer serves as a Police Officer, Firefighter, and Medical First Responder.

== Public safety model ==
The Kalamazoo Police Department and Kalamazoo Fire Department were merged in the 1980s with the goal of saving significant tax payer money while increasing the amount of police and fire protection for its citizens. The merger of the departments was a difficult process on reaching agreement with unions covering the fire department and police department. The difficult effort of the merger of the departments along with the successes was even noted by the United States House of Representatives in the Congressional Record.

As the largest public safety department in the nation, Kalamazoo Public Safety is now considered a model public safety department and often consults and trains other cities throughout the world on the public safety model.

== Controversies ==
In 1995 a grand jury was convened to investigate missing cash and contraband from Kalamazoo Public Safety's evidence room. Although much of the evidence and investigation remains secret and the US Attorney declined to prosecute, the city attorney at the time has publicly acknowledged that the incident happened

In 2013, the department received the results of a year-long, independent study it commissioned on racial targeting. The study showed that police in Kalamazoo were more than twice as likely to pull over black drivers than white drivers. Since this time the department claims it has been working hard to confront the racial bias in its department and has received international news coverage for attempting to address the racial issues the department acknowledges it has.

In June 2025, the Kalamazoo Department of Public Safety blocked external access to its automated license plate reader cameras after it was revealed that searches of its camera data were being performed by other law enforcement agencies for "immigration-related violations."

== Casualties ==
On April 18, 2011, while responding to a shots fired call in Kalamazoo's Edison neighborhood, PSO Eric Zapata was fatally shot. Officer Zapata was the first officer in Kalamazoo to be killed in the line of duty.
