= Youth in Focus =

Youth photography organization in Seattle, Washington

- Founded: 1994
- Purpose: Art, photography, community, empowering adolescents
- Location(s): 2100 24th Ave. S. Suite 310; Seattle, Washington 98144, United States
- Website: Youth in Focus website

Youth in Focus is a non-profit youth photography organization in Seattle, Washington that offers photography classes for youth (13–19 years of age) in order to help young people develop skills and attitudes to overcome barriers they face and support them on their journey to a positive adulthood.

There are just 11 pupils in each session, one teaching artist, and numerous adult volunteer mentors. Core classes include three levels of traditional black and white film and two levels of digital photography. Classes meet twice weekly over nine weeks for a total of 60 hours of instruction, plus time spent outside class working on assignments, and the schedule mirrors the Seattle Public Schools calendar.

== History ==
=== Founding ===
Youth in Focus was founded in 1994 by retired high school teacher Walter Bodle. During his 30-year teaching career in Compton, California, Walter would ask, "What is the big difference that makes one young person become a successful orthopedic surgeon, and the one who sat next to him in class is dead or in jail before the age of 20?" The answer always was found with an adult who took time to care and support.

The organization started summer photography program in a borrowed darkroom, and as a result, 14 youths completed the first 10-week session of Youth in Focus. The organization was incorporated as a non-profit in 1997. Today, this nationally-recognized program has afternoon and summer sessions and serves nearly 200 participants each year. The organization offers free classes year-round in a purpose-built photography space. Youth in Focus continues to expand its service through partnerships with other local youth service agencies and by providing advice and encouragement across the country to other groups who seek to emulate our model of youth empowerment through photography. When not traveling, Walter lives in Seattle's Madrona neighborhood with his wife, Lynne Iglitzin, and dog, Candy.

Youth in Focus began working with the Raikes Foundation in 2010 to participate in the Youth Program Quality Initiative. Youth Program Quality Assessment (YPQA) scores for Youth in Focus, in the Spring of 2011 and 2012, were consistently higher than comparison scores for 780 other National Youth programs. Our scores were higher in all main categories, and significantly higher in Supportive Environment and Youth Engagement.

=== Recent events ===
In 2013, Youth and Focus was chosen by KEXP-FM, Starbucks and Seattle Theater Group as at the beneficiary of The Little Big Show #5. Working together, they raised over $14,000 for the students.

== Mission statement ==
Youth in Focus mission is to empower urban youth, through photography, to experience their world in new ways and to make positive choices for their lives. The organization's goal is to put cameras in the hands of low income, at-risk youth and place them in a challenging environment surrounded by high quality talented teachers, nurturing adult volunteer mentors, and create a strong community of support. Through photography, the students are able to find their voice, identity, creativity, and gain new confidence in their worth and abilities.

After an interview process, accepted students are given a $1,000 scholarship, covering the total cost of instruction and equipment. Classes meet with their teaching artists and mentors twice a week for three hours over a nine-week quarter. Students submit, display and discuss their final work during our End of Quarter Show. Youth in Focus partners with other agencies to provide photography workshops in order to expand our reach and to enhance the partner's regular programming. The organization has worked with community centers, schools and other youth service agencies. They are currently partnering with Friends of the Children and Youth Care, South Lake High School and Big Picture High School, among others.

== Accomplishments ==
The President's Committee on the Arts and Humanities recognized Youth in Focus as a model program in the year 2000, providing "life-changing activities" to youth with limited opportunities. Our students have shown their work at the Seattle Art Museum, Henry Art Gallery, Frye Art Museum, Benham Gallery and the Washington State Convention Center, and among other local venues. The prestige of these locations is a testament to both to the quality of the work the students produce, and their passion for the medium.
