= Police brutality by country =

Notable cases of police brutality have occurred in various countries.

== Africa ==
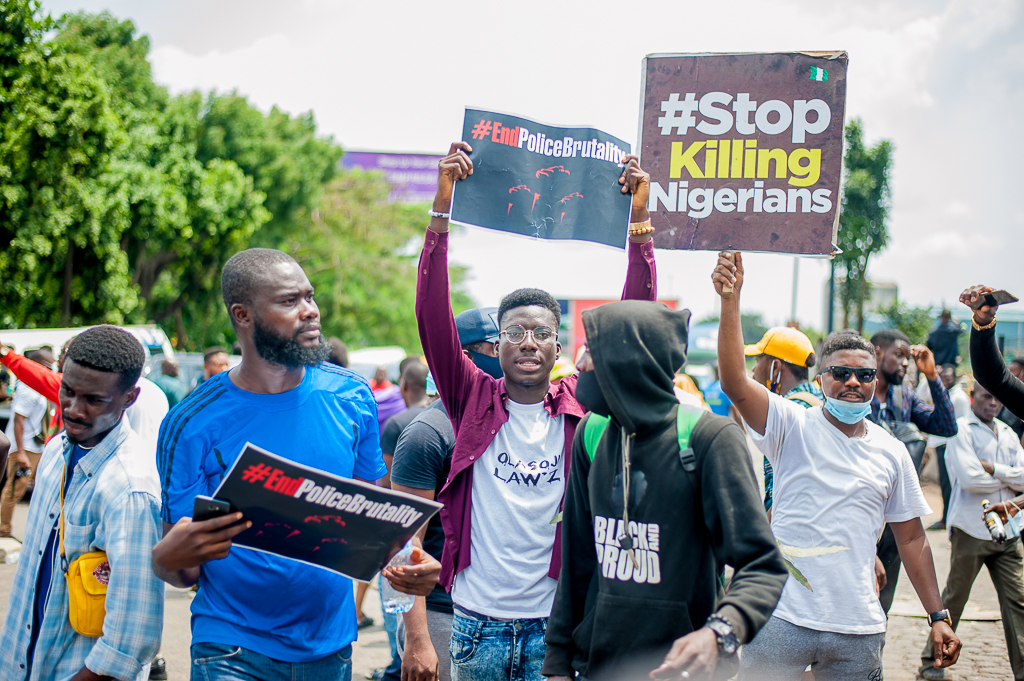
End SARS is a decentralised social movement, and series of mass protests against police brutality in Nigeria.

=== Uganda ===
Under President Idi Amin, many Ugandan people were killed by police, including minority groups. Many others were tortured.

=== South Africa ===
Incidents of police brutality skyrocketed by 312% from 2011 to 2012 compared to 2001 to 2002, with only 1 in 100 cases leading to a conviction. There were also 720 deaths in police custody due to police action from 2011 to 2012.

In 2015, as a result of police officers being accused of crimes such as rape, torture, and murder, the cost of civil liabilities claims were so great that there was concern the costs would strain the South African Police Service national budget. The police commissioner at the time, Riah Phiyega, blamed the large number of claims "on a highly litigious climate".

Police brutality has spread throughout Soweto. Nathaniel Julius was killed in Soweto by police officers from the El Dorado police station. He was a 16 year old boy with Down syndrome, and was shot because he didn't respond to the police officer calling him. This action was not warranted because Nathaniel didn't have any weapons on him and he was just walking from the store after buying biscuits. Two police officers were arrested over Julius' death on murder charges, after mass protests against this in the area. South African police are commonly accused of excessive force, with ten deaths attributed to police the same year (2020).

=== Ethiopia ===
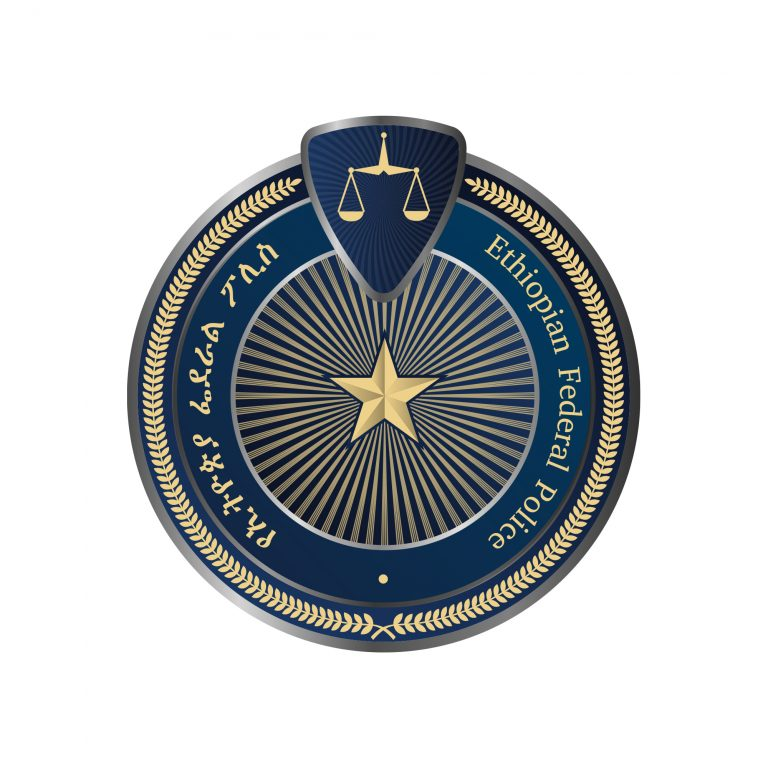
The Federal Police Commission coat of arms and logo

Police brutality in Ethiopia falls under the aegis of the Ethiopian Federal Police (EFP), which has responsibility for safeguarding civil law and abiding the country's constitution under Proclamation 2000, 2003 or 2011. Under Federal Police Officer Administration Regulation of 2012, dual obligation is promulgated to reinforce the law that every police officers should respect international human rights instructions and legal liability.

=== Egypt ===
Police brutality was a major contribution to the 2011 Egyptian revolution and Khaled Said's death, though little has changed since. One of the "demands" around which people decided to take to the streets in Egypt was "purging the Ministry of Interior" for its brutality and torture practices. After six months of reporting gang rape, a woman in Egypt is still seeking justice not only for herself, but also those who were witnesses in her favor and are jailed, tortured in pretrial custody. The lack of investigation into the Fairmont Hotel rape case of 2014 has also put the Egyptian authorities under condemnation. Reportedly, the prime witnesses of the case have been subjected to drug testing, virginity tests and publicly defamed, while their families suffer trauma.

=== Mauritius ===
On the island state of Mauritius the Independent Police Complaints Commission (IPCC) was set up in April 2018 under the Independent Police Complaints Commission Act 2016. The IPCC was in fact a rebranding of the Police Complaints Commission (PCC), with exactly the same objectives, powers and its amenities remain at Emmanuel Anquetil Building in Port-Louis. It employed around 20 individuals at the time of its creation. IPCC's main objective is to investigate complaints of misconduct made against any officer of the Mauritius Police Force (MPF), including corruption, money laundering, death in custody and police brutality. However its critics point out that the IPCC is weakened due to political interference, especially the Prime Minister's Office (PMO) in a similar manner that the ICAC became progressively powerless due to such interference.

In June 2024 Prime Minister Pravind Jugnauth reported that since its inception the IPCC had recorded 4229 complaints, leading to 2375 investigations, out of which 445 complaints were dropped. 48 cases have been referred to the Director of Public Prosecutions (DPP) and 17 cases had progressed to legal prosecution. IPCC has also suspended 1643 complaints due to insufficient evidence. From 2005 to 2009 the number of police brutality cases was 1149, but the number had dropped to only 257 from 2014 to 2024. Despite this apparent attenuation, cases of police brutality regularly make front page headlines in the local Mauritian press.

Notable cases of police brutality include the 1999 death in custody of singer Joseph Réginald Topize also known as Kaya, which led to the nationwide 1999 Mauritian riots. There is also the 1982 murder of Sylvio Suntoo and his pregnant girlfriend Patricia Muttur at Ratsitatane Road in Plaisance, Rose Hill during a violent police raid of Suntoo's home. Police tried in vain to mask these murders as suicide. More than 200 policemen were involved in the dawn raid as police mistakenly suspected that Sylvio Suntoo was involved in an armed hold-up at the Curepipe head office of CEB on 24 February 1982 during which a gangster shot dead police constable Jean Nelzire. But 8 years later in 1990 police revealed that Suntoo was innocent, as their investigation of a subsequent hold-up uncovered a gang based in the city of Port Louis as the true perpetrators of these armed hold-ups. As police commissioner Rajarai, his deputy Bhardwoze Juggernauth and assistant commissioners of police Cyril Huet, C. Nicolas and Ecosse Marcel took a keen interest in the case, a number of innocent citizens became victims of police brutality, including the Robertson couple (who lived in the same house as Suntoo and Muttur) and Clifford Esther (whose residence at La Preneuse was raided on suspicions that Suntoo was hiding there).

=== Mozambique ===
Mozambique security forces such as the Mozambique Republic Police (PRM), have been indicated in various reports as key culprits of unlawful and arbitrary killings. They have been reported throughout the country for killing unarmed citizens for negligible breaches of the law, and sometimes for no violation at all.

In 2010, a riot occurred in Mozambique in response to a 30% rise in the price of bread in the country. Demonstrators burnt tires, blocking roads, and stole from shops in the capital of Mozambique, Maputo. According to the police officials, real bullets were used to shoot the rioters once they run out of rubber bullets. Hospital and police sources identified the death toll at six people, including two children. An unknown citizen stated that the police were heavily armed and arbitrarily firing live bullets at anyone they thought were involved, causing the death of innocent bystanders.

== Asia ==
=== Bangladesh ===
On February 21, 1952, in Dhaka, then part of East Pakistan, students from the University of Dhaka and Dhaka Medical College organized a demonstration to protest the decision to establish Urdu as the only state language. Despite the enforcement of Section 144, which banned public gatherings, the students assembled peacefully. However, police were ordered to disperse the crowd. This led to the use of tear gas and eventually live ammunition against the unarmed students. Several students, including Abdul Jabbar, Rafiq Uddin Ahmed, Abul Barkat, and Abdus Salam, were killed in the crackdown.

In May 2017, a man named Shamim Reja was killed by police in the Sonargaon police station. The victim's father claimed that his son was tortured in the police station as the police wanted Bangladeshi Taka (BDT) 600,000. Police investigated and the officer-in-charge Arup Torofar, SI Paltu Ghush, and ASP Uttam Prashad were found guilty as charged.

=== China ===
Politically motivated riots and protests have occurred historically in China, notably with the 1989 Tiananmen Square protests and massacre. Associations such as Falun Gong have objected against the Chinese Communist Party (CCP) and which are dispersed by riot police. Chinese protesters have been able to systematize powerful group mobilizations with the use of social media and informal mass communication like Twitter and its Chinese counterparts Weibo. Human Rights Watch reported that police routinely torture and ill-treat detainees in pretrial detention, where "detainees have been forced to spend days shackled to 'tiger chairs,' hung by the wrists, and subjected to abuse by 'cell bosses'—fellow detainees overseeing cells on behalf of the police."

==== Hong Kong SAR ====
Hong Kong police storm Prince Edward station on 31 August 2019.

During the 2014 Hong Kong protests, there were numerous instances of police brutality. Seven police officers were caught on video kicking and beating a prominent political activist who was already handcuffed. There had also been more than hundreds of incidents of police beating passers-by with batons. Pictures on local TV and social media show demonstrators being dragged behind police lines, circled by police officers so that onlookers' views were blocked, and in some cases, re-emerging with visible injuries. An officer-involved, retired police officer Frankly Chu King-wai was sentenced to three months in prison for causing serious bodily harm.

During the 2019–20 Hong Kong protests which gained extensive international coverage, complaints of police brutality increased substantially and broke previous records of complaints.

Cases that have caused outrage include the police's mauling and intentional head-shooting of protesters by rubber bullets and rapid tear-gassing of a surrounded crowd. Numerous were critically wounded. Many Hong Kong citizens accuse the police of attempting to murder protesters to deter the people from exercising their freedom of expression.

Amnesty International released a report on 21 June 2019 denouncing the role of the Hong Kong police in the 12 June protest that ended up in bloodshed.

Several street conflicts continued in Hong Kong throughout July 2019. Instances of police striking journalists with batons to obstruct their live reporting have been filmed.

On the night of 31 August 2019, more than 200 riot police officers entered the Prince Edward MTR station and attacked suspects in a train compartment on the Tsuen Wan line with batons and pepper spray. Many suspects sustained head injuries.

=== East Timor ===
In the early morning of 18 November 2018, an off-duty police officer shot dead three young men at a house party in the capital of Dili, he and three other officers were arrested for the shooting. The shooting sparked mass demonstrations in the days following the shooting.

=== Iran ===
The 2009 Iranian Presidential election protests over the victory of Mahmoud Ahmeninejad, the police and paramilitary forces used excessive force against protesters, injuring and killing many. Many detentions, injuries and deaths of protesters, including children, were also reported on the 2019-2020 protests.

In April 2018, a video showed a female member of Iran's morality police slapping a woman and wrestling her to the ground, for allegedly not complying with Iran's mandatory headscarf. The police's actions were widely condemned, including by Iran's vice-president for women's affairs, Masoumeh Ebtekar. Iran's interior ministry ordered an inquiry.

On September 13, 2022, Mahsa Amini, a Kurdish woman was detained by authorities. She was announced dead on September 16, 2022, allegedly due to cardiac arrest. However, it was likely due to injuries acquired due to the brutality she encountered. This incident sparked massive protests, and women burning the mandatory headscarf. The head of Tehran's morality police was later suspended.

In 2026, thousands of anti-regime protesters have been killed.

=== Iraq ===
Saddam Hussein used to use the police to arrest any one who opposed him.

=== Israel ===
In April 2015 an Ethiopian soldier in the IDF was the victim of an unprovoked and allegedly racist attack by an Israeli policeman and the attack was caught on video. The soldier, Damas Pakedeh, was arrested and accused of attacking the policeman. He believes the incident was racially motivated and that if the video had not been taken, he would have been punished. Likud MK Avraham Neguise called on National Police Chief Yohanan Danino to prosecute the police officer and volunteer, saying they engaged in "a gross violation of the basic law of respecting others and their liberty by those who are supposed to protect us". The Jerusalem Post notes that in 2015 "there have been a series of reports in the Israeli press about alleged acts of police brutality against Ethiopian Israelis, with many in the community saying they are unfairly targeted and treated more harshly than other citizens". The incident of police brutality with Pakedeh and alleged brutality of officials from Israel's Administration of Border Crossings, Population and Immigration with Walla Bayach, an Israeli of Ethiopian descent, brought the Ethiopian community to protest. Hundreds of Ethiopians participated in protests the streets of Jerusalem on 20 April 2015, to decry what they view as "rampant racism" and violence in Israel directed at their community. Israel Police Commissioner Yohanan Danino met with representatives of the Israeli Ethiopian community that day following the recent violent incidents involving police officers and members of the community. When over a thousand people protested police brutality against Ethiopians and dark skinned Israelis, Prime Minister Benjamin Netanyahu announced: "I strongly condemn the beating of the Ethiopian IDF soldier, and those responsible will be held accountable." Following protests and demonstrations in Tel Aviv that resulted in violence, Netanyahu planned to meet with representatives of the Ethiopian community, including Pakedeh. Netanyahu said the meeting would include Danino and representatives of several ministries, including Immigrant Absorption. Danino already announced that the officer who beat Pakedeh had been fired.

=== India ===
During India's independence struggle, protesters and activists were subject to Lathi charges and shootings. One such incident is recalled as the Jallianwala Bagh massacre, where a crowd gathered to protest the Rowlatt act were indiscriminately fired at, on the orders of a British Officer, General Dyer with officially reported 379 casualties.

During the emergency of 1975-1977, several cases of Police Brutality were recorded, including the Rajan case on 31 March 1976.

On 23 January 2017, a pro-jallikattu silent protest in Tamil Nadu turned violent. The National Human Rights Commission consolidated reports that the police used violent methods without prior warning, including beatings and damaging private property, to disperse protesters in Chennai. There were widespread social media reports of police setting vehicles on fire. On 15 December 2019 police authorities baton-charged students who were protesting against the controversial Citizenship Amendment Act at University Library of Jamia Milia University, New Delhi. The Lathi Charge is very well known in India for excessive use of force done by police during mass protests or riots.

=== Indonesia ===
Islamic extremists in Indonesia have been targeted by police as terrorists in the country. In many cases, they are either captured or killed. There are cases of police corruption involving hidden bank accounts and retaliation against journalists investigating these claims; one example occurred in June 2012 when Indonesian magazine Tempo had journalist activists beaten by police. Separately, on 31 August 2013 police officers in Central Sulawesi province fired into a crowd of people protesting the death of a local man in police custody; five people were killed and 34 injured. The police's history of violence goes back to the military-backed Suharto regime (1967–1998) when Suharto seized power during an alleged coup and instituted an anti-Communist purge.

Criminal investigations into human rights violations by the police are rare, punishments are light, and Indonesia has no independent national body to deal effectively with public complaints. Amnesty International has called on Indonesia to review police tactics during arrests and public order policing to ensure that they meet international standards.

Since 2020, there are more recorded cases of police brutality in Indonesia. The most notable current events of police brutalities was the murder of Nofriansyah Yosua Hutabarat ordered by Inspector General Ferdy Sambo and the Kanjuruhan Stadium disaster that killed total 135 people both happened in 2022. In November 2024, a local vocational school student Gamma Rizkynata Oktafandy was killed in Semarang after his motorcycle crashed into an off duty police officer motorcycle, the Police chief framed Gamma to be part of the gang and participated in a brawl, his statement were later denied by witnesses. In August 2025, two motorcycle taxi riders, Affan Kurniawan and Umar Amarudin, were deliberately hit by a police armored vehicle during the August 2025 Indonesian protests, in which Kurniawan lost his life, while Amarudin received several fatal injuries.

=== Japan ===
On May 22, 2020, Tokyo Metropolitan Police officers were filmed shoving a Kurdish man down on the ground when he was stopped; the man didn't allow the officers to search his car. One of the officers kicked the man while pinned down.

=== Malaysia ===
During the Bersih protests, Royal Malaysia Police officers attacked protesters and killed one. Malaysian police also cane prisoners for several offences, including theft, drug dealing and molestation.

=== Philippines ===
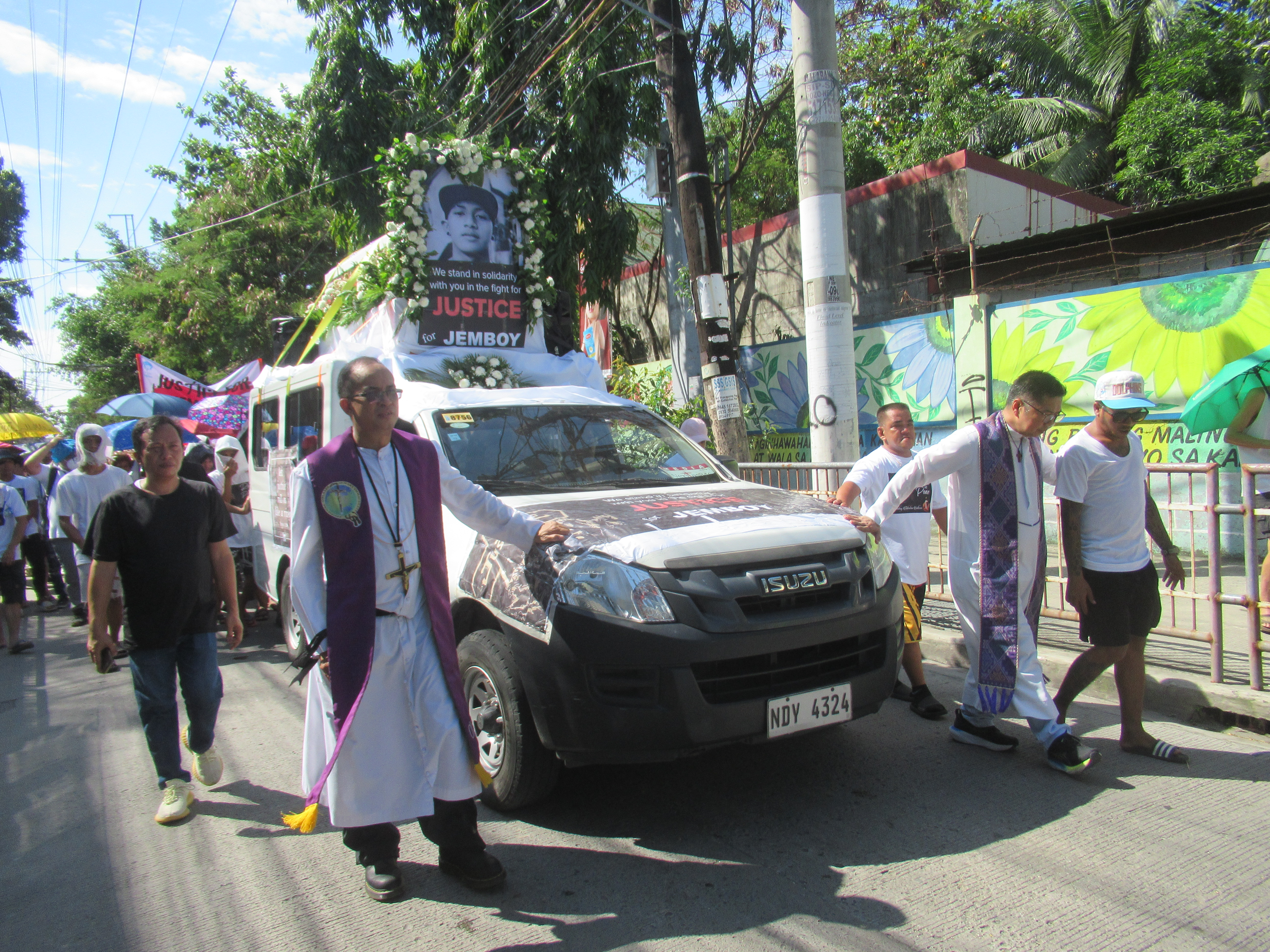
On August 2, 2023, Jerhode Baltazar was shot (mistaken for a murder) by Navotas cops

The discussions of police brutality in the Philippines were revived on 21 December 2020 when a civilian police officer Jonel Nuezca shot his two unarmed neighbors following an argument over an improvised noise maker known locally as boga set up by the victim a day earlier. The incident sparked nationwide outrage and most news organizations linked the incident to the war on drugs. Prior to the incident, Philippine president Rodrigo Duterte had made remarks on ordering the police to shoot-to-kill but Duterte "denied" it to "shoot" on civilians.

Human Rights Watch stated that police brutality is commonplace in the country. During the Philippine drug war under Duterte, police were linked to torture, mistreatment, and thousands of extrajudicial killings.

In October 2025, human rights advocates and families of those arrested during the anti-corruption protests organized Alyansa laban sa Korapsyon at Brutalidad ng Pulis (AKAB) to support victims of police brutality in the Philippines.

In November 2026, the International Association of Democratic Lawyers, the Asia Pacific Forum on Women Law and Development, and other international groups, Philippine lawmakers, civil society organization, and church groups criticized mass arrests and alleged police brutality at protests during the 49th ASEAN Summit in the Philippines.

=== United Arab Emirates ===
The Gulf Cooperation Council (GCC) member states have seen many cases of brutality, with some even involving senior figures. For example, Issa bin Zayed Al Nahyan, a United Arab Emirates (UAE) sheikh, was involved in the torture of many business associates. He often recorded some of the abuse. Issa was eventually arrested but a court found him not guilty and released him. Amnesty International reported that a UAE worker was subjected to a wide array of torture methods during his time in jail, including beatings and sleep deprivation. UAE prisoners are also treated poorly and tortured.

=== Saudi Arabia ===
Authorities in Saudi Arabia have also been filmed lashing civilians for different reasons.

Jamal Khashoggi was a Saudi-American activist and his death inside a Saudi Embassy drew widespread criticism. In October 2018, he went into the Embassy in Turkey. On that same day, a group of Saudi authorities entered the country and intercepted him at the Embassy and killed him soon after. They disposed of his body and then returned to Saudi Arabia.

=== Bahrain ===
In Bahrain, police and military personnel manhandled and shot dead many Arab Spring protesters.

=== Pakistan ===
Pakistan's law enforcement is divided into multiple tiers, including forces under provincial and federal government control. The law strictly prohibits any physical abuse of suspected or convicted criminals; however, due to deficiencies during the training process, there have been reported instances of suspected police brutality. Reported cases are often investigated by police authorities as well as civil courts leading to mixed outcomes.

A recent case includes the purported extra judicial killing of a man named Naqeebullah by an ex-officer named "Rao Anwar". Taking notice of the matter, the Supreme Court issued arrest and detention warrants in the case to arrest the accused.

In October 2019, the People National Alliance organised a rally to free Kashmir from Pakistani rule. As a result of the police trying to stop the rally, 100 people were injured.

=== Thailand ===
In 1976, Thai police, military personnel and others, were seen shooting at protesters at Thammasat University. Many were killed and many survivors were abused.

=== Turkey ===
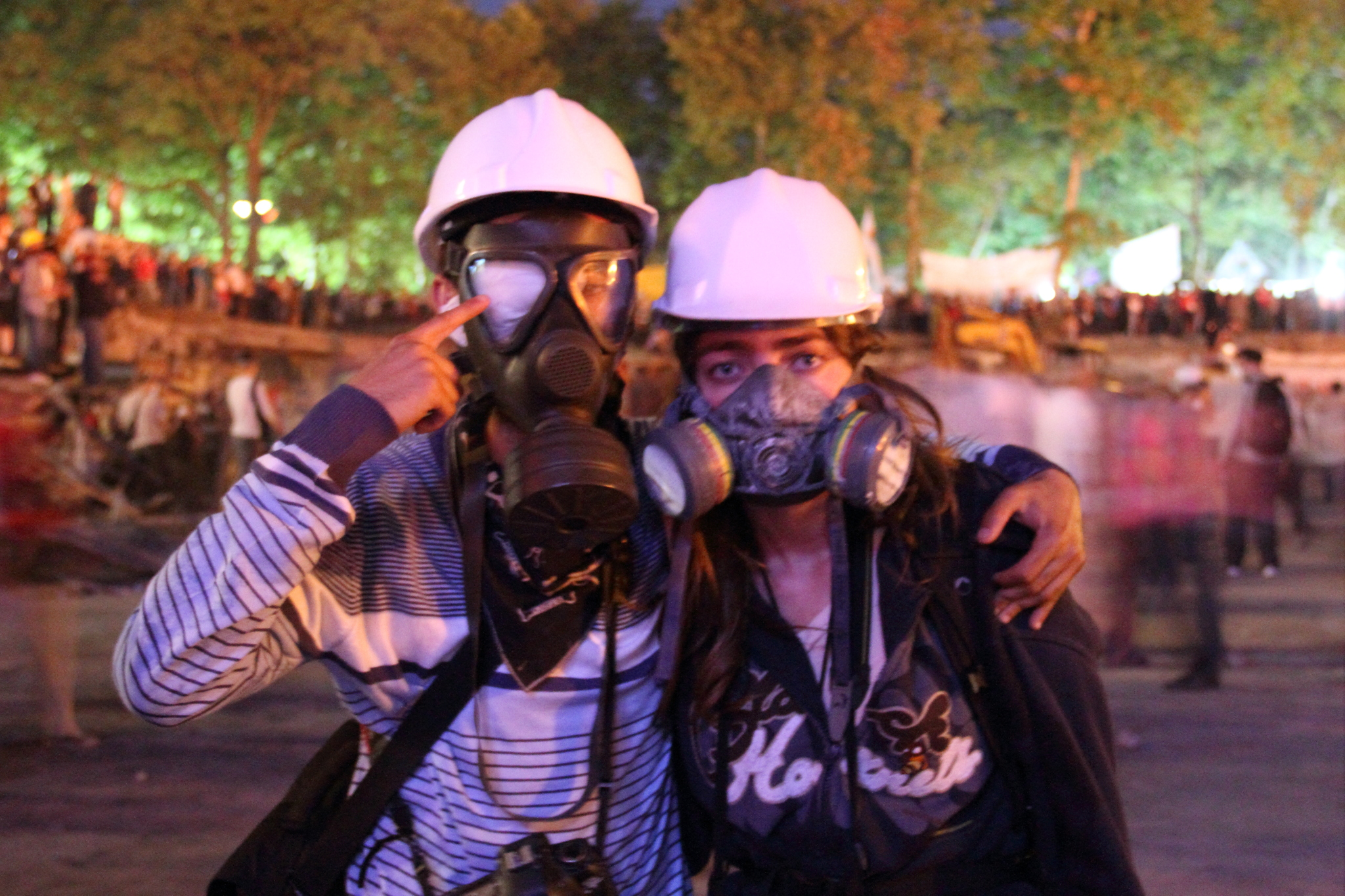
A protester shows his wounded eye. Police brutality was one of the main issues arising from the 2013 protests in Turkey.

Turkey has a history of police brutality, including the use of torture particularly between 1977 and 2002. Police brutality featured excessive use of tear gas (including targeting protesters with tear gas canisters), pepper spray, and water cannons. Physical violence against protesters has been observed, for example, in the suppression of Kurdish protests and May Day demonstrations. The 2013 protests in Turkey were in response to the brutal police suppression of an environmentalist sit-in protesting the removal of Taksim Gezi Park.

In 2012 several officials received prison sentences for their role in the death in custody of the political activist Engin Çeber.

The European Court of Human Rights has noted the failure of the Turkish investigating authorities to carry out effective investigations into allegations of ill-treatment by law enforcement personnel during demonstrations.

In 2021, the General Directorate of Security issued a circular banning all audio-visual recordings of law enforcement officers at protests.

=== Turkmenistan ===
Arbitrary arrests and mistreatment of detained persons are common in Turkmenistan, as is torture to obtain confessions. In 2004, border guards shot and killed six people who were allegedly illegally crossing the border from Iran. There are reports of prisoners dying after having food and medical care withheld. Ogulsapar Myradowa, a journalist and human rights activist, died violently in prison in September 2006.

In 2018's Country Reports on Human Rights Practices by the US State Department, Turkmenistan was condemned for "alleged torture", arbitrary arrests and detentions, involuntary confinement, imprisonment of political prisoners, severe corruption, lack of free and fair elections, and restrictions on freedom of religion, assembly, and movement.

== Europe ==
=== Austria ===
In Vienna, there is an association made between Vienna's drug problem and the city's African migrants, which have led to African migrants being racially profiled.

There have been several highly publicized incidents in Austria where police have either tortured, publicly humiliated, or violently beaten people—in some cases, to the point of death. While the most notorious of these incidents occurred in the late 1990s, incidents as recent as 2019 are being investigated by the Vienna Police Department for Special Investigations.

24 April 1996: Nicola Jevremović, a Serbian Romani man, tried to pay a friend's parking fine and was harassed by police. He escaped and a group of 25 to 40 police officers entered his home without a warrant. The police officers violently beat him and his wife, Violetta Jevremović, in front of their children and then arrested the couple. The couple were made to wait outside for half an hour in front of their neighbours, allegedly to humiliate them. Nicola Jevremović was initially fined for a misdemeanor and found guilty in 1997 of "resisting arrest". Violetta Jevremović was found guilty of "suspicion of resisting arrest".
November 1998: Dr. C, a black Austrian citizen, was stopped by police after reversing his car into a one-way street and asked, "Why are you driving the wrong way, nigger?". He was beaten unconscious and handcuffed. Police continued beating him after he regained consciousness. After he was arrested, he spent 11 days recovering in the hospital.
May 1999: Marcus Omofuma, a Nigerian asylum-seeker, was being deported from Vienna when the officers taped him to his chair "like a mummy" and stuck tape over his mouth. He suffocated whilst in police custody.
1 January 2015: A 47-year-old woman was beaten and taken into custody after refusing to take a breathalyzer test while walking home on New Year's Eve. She suffered a fractured coccyx, and severe bruising to her head and knees. She filed a complaint and received no response. The case was re-examined by the prosecutor only after she found CCTV footage.
28 July 2015: A 27-year-old man, suspected of being a pickpocket, was handcuffed and violently thrown to the ground while in police custody. Police said that the man had been injured while "pressing his head against the wall". Video evidence showed him being passive and compliant before the altercation.

There has been a notable lack of commitment to addressing the violation of civilians' rights in Austria, with Amnesty International reporting that in 1998–1999 very few people who violated human rights were brought to justice. This was worsened by the fact that many people who made a complaint against police were brought up on counter-charges such as resisting arrest, defamation, and assault.

From 2014 to 2015, 250 accusations of police misconduct were made against officers in Vienna with none being charged, though 1,329 people were charged with "civil disorder" in a similar time period. The Council of Europe's Committee for the Prevention of Torture (CPT)'s 2014 report included several complaints of police using excessive force with detainees and psychiatric patients. The culture of excusing police officers for their misconduct has continued into the present day, and any complaints of mistreatment are often met with inadequate investigations and judicial proceedings.

Austria has legislation that criminalizes hate speech against anyone's race, religion, nationality, or ethnicity. Laws like this discourage discrimination, help with altering public perceptions of different ethnic and cultural groups, and subsequently reduce the number of racially motivated incidents of police brutality. Austria has several NGOs that are trying to implement broad programs that encourage positive cross-cultural relations and more targeted programs such as racial sensitivity training for police. The Austrian police are formulating their policies to prevent police brutality and to make prosecuting police misconduct fairer. In January 2016, Austrian police forces started a trial of wearing body cameras to document civilian—police interactions.

However, it appears that incidents of police brutality are still occurring. Amnesty International suggested that more work needs to be done by the government to reduce negative stereotypes that lead to prejudice, racial profiling, hatred, and police brutality. One suggestion was to disband the Bereitschaftspolizei, Vienna's riot police, as they have frequently been involved with human rights violations and situations of police brutality. Amnesty International also proposed that the Austrian government adopt a National Action Plan against Racism, something which they had previously refused to do. Such a plan was required by the 2001 Durban Declaration and Programme of Action.

=== Belarus ===
In May 2021, authorities stopped Ryanair Flight 4978 in Belarusian airspace. A Belarusian journalist and activist, Roman Protasevich was taken off the plane and detained by authorities.

=== Belgium ===
Belgian law enforcement changed to two police forces operating on a federal and local level in 2001 after a three-tier police system. While the two services remain independent, they integrate common training programs and recruitment. The change was prompted by a national parliamentary report into a series of pedophile murders which proved police negligence and severely diminished public confidence. Currently, approximately 33,000 local police and 900 civilians work across 196 regional police forces.

The United Nations (UN) Basic Principles on the Use of Force and Firearms by Law Enforcement Officials (1990) are replicated in Belgian law through The Criminal Code and the Police Functions Act. These principles dictate that the use of force should be proportionate, appropriate, reported, and delivered on time; however, the UN Human Rights Committee reported complaints of ill-treatment against property and people by police escalated between 2005 and 2011, most commonly involving assault against persons no longer posing danger. Belgian judicial authorities were found to also have failed to notify national police watchdog, Committee P, of criminal convictions against police, which is both a direct breach of Belgian judicial procedure and a failure to comply with Article 40 of the International Covenant on Civil and Political Rights.

An extreme instance in January 2010 led to the death of Jonathan Jacob in Mortsel. He was apprehended by local Mortsel police for behaving strangely under the influence of amphetamines. The footage depicted eight officers from Antwerp police's Special Intervention Unit restraining and beating Jacob after he had been injected with a sedative sparked public outrage. Jacob died from internal bleeding following the incident, but police claimed they did not make any mistakes and "acted carefully, respecting the necessary precautions".

In 2013, the Grand Chamber of the European Court of Human Rights (ECtHR) convicted Belgium of human rights violations in an appeal on the treatment of two brothers in custody who had been slapped by an officer. The Grand Chamber voiced its concern that "a slap inflicted by a law-enforcement officer on an individual who is entirely under his control constitutes a serious attack on the individual's dignity". The Belgian League of Human Rights (LDH) monitored police brutality through the Observatory of Police Violence (OBSPOL) after Belgium downplayed cases. OBSPOL was formed in 2013 and collects testimonies on its website, informs police brutality victims of their rights, and strongly advocating public policy being adapted in of favor victim protection.

Several other instances of police violence can be noted in Belgium. In 2014, Mawda, a four-year-old child was killed in an encounter with a truck used to carry migrants across the border. A police officer shot on the moving car, despite knowing a child was in it. The case got widespread media attention, but the police officer only ended up with a 400€ fine and one year of suspended prison sentence.

In 2018, Lamine Bangoura was killed in his own apartment by eight policemen because he had not paid rent. In the attempt to evict him out of his flat, the policemen used unwarranted brutality which resulted in Lamine's death.

In 2019, Mehdi, 17-year-old Moroccan boy was run over by a police car on patrol. In 2020, Adil, a 19-year-old Moroccan boy was chased by a police car for not respecting COVID-19 lockdowns. He was hit by a police car to stop him in his chase, which killed him on impact. Sources say it was on purpose, even though he was on a scooter. Both these cases had been filed as dismissed.

In 2021, Ibrahima was arrested. He was filming a police control. The authorities however, said he was arrested for not respecting the curfew, which starts at 10pm, even though his arrest happened at 6pm. He died in police custody, in unknown circumstances. His death prompted a lot of reaction from the public, who organized a protest a few days after his killing.

=== Croatia ===
The Constitution of Croatia prohibits torture, mistreatment, and cruel and degrading punishment under Article 17, and accords arrested and convicted persons humane treatment under Article 25 of the OHCHR. Croatia has a centralised police force under the command of the Ministry of the Interior with approximately 20,000 police officers.

From 1991 to 1995, the Croatian police, in addition to their regular police tasks, were a militarised force charged with the role of defending the country while seceding from Yugoslavia. Military training taught police officers to use firearms before exhausting other procedures, which has affected the philosophy and behaviour of police officers in using excessive force. Developments were made to achieve democratic policing as a modern, professional force that is also accountable to the public. However, citizen complaints of violent police behaviour suggest that the militarization of the police force in the early 1990s continues to influence the level of force accepted as legitimate and reasonable by Croatian police officers.

The European Court of Human Rights has found that Croatian police authorities have failed to fulfill their obligations, on numerous occasions, under Article 3 of the European Convention on Human Rights and Fundamental Freedoms by failing to carry out effective investigations to protect its citizens and tourists from violent attacks. In 2009, the European Court of Human Rights condemned Croatian police authorities for ignoring requests to starting an investigation into perpetrators who violently attacked a Croatian citizen.

The Croatian police have a history of discriminatory abuse and failing to recognise violence against the Romani minority living in Croatia. The European Commission against Racism and Intolerance noted that Croatian police abuse against minority groups including Romani were continually reported; police authorities are reluctant to take violence against Romani people seriously. Police investigations into black market selling in Croatia have been excessively violent towards Romani vendors, with reports of physical violence and abusive racism being directed at them. The Romani women's association, "Better Future", reported that police had beaten a pregnant Romani woman who attempted to evade arrest for black market selling in 2002.

The Croatian police violence has been used to intimidate refugees travelling from Serbia into Croatia. This included segregating nationalities, with Syrian, Iraqi, and Afghani nationals gaining entry to Croatia as refugees more easily than other nationalities. An unaccompanied sixteen-year-old from Morocco recounted his experience trying to gain asylum in Croatia after lying about being a Syrian national: "We had to get into a police car [...] They told us this is Slovenia, but then it was Serbia [...] One of my friends tried to run away, but the Croatian police caught [sic] him and beat him."

=== Denmark ===
The Police of Denmark has a force of approximately 11,000 officers and they serve in the 12 police districts and the two Danish overseas territories. The Danish Independent Police Complaints Authority (Den Uafhængige Politiklagemyndighed) (the Authority) handles the investigation of police misconduct allegations. Annual statistics released by the Authority revealed a reduction in the number of complaints against police from 2012 to 2015. In 2012, the Authority received 726 conduct complaints from across Denmark; in 2015, the number of complaints fell to 509, representing approximately 0.05 complaints per officer. A majority of complaints stem from general misconduct, such as traffic violations and unprofessional behaviour (e.g., swearing).

However, the 2015 Annual Report identifies some instances where the Police of Denmark used excessive force. For example, the Authority investigated a complaint made about alleged violence against an arrested person in Christianshavn on 15 March 2016. Another investigation looked into the alleged use of force against a 16-year-old boy on 28 June 2016, which resulted in charges being laid against the two offending police officers from the Sydsjællands- and Lolland-Falster police department. Although examples of police brutality are not common, highly publicised incidents have been reported.

- In 2002, 21-year-old Jens Arne Orskov Mathiason died while in police custody on the way to prison. The incident raised concerns over the behaviour of the officers involved, the thoroughness of the subsequent investigation, and the willingness of the Director of Public Prosecutions to hold the officers accountable for their alleged failings. As a result, Amnesty International called for the establishment of new policies to investigate human rights violations and enforce compliance under the European Convention on Human Rights.
- In January 2016, a man died in police custody after being arrested by seven Copenhagen Police officers.
- In August 2009, police in Copenhagen were heavily criticised for their response to an attempt to remove Iraqi refugees who were living in a city church. Video allegedly showed the police using violence against the refugees and their supporters. Between 12,000 and 20,000 people subsequently protested against these actions.
- In 2012, the Danish Court of Appeal concluded that the Danish Police had violated Article 3 (against abusive treatment and torture) and Articles 5, 10, and 11 (dealing with the right to liberty, the right to information about the accusation, and the freedom of peaceful assembly) of the European Convention of Human Rights for the 2009 mass arrest made during protests at the 2009 United Nations Climate Change Conference in Copenhagen.

To ensure that police are well-trained and to mitigate the risk of police brutality, police recruits undergo approximately three years of training; at the National Police College, recruits learn about police theory, the Road Traffic Act, criminal law, physical training, other legislation, first aid, radio communication, securing evidence, identifying drugs, preventing crime, management, human rights, and cultural sociology to name a few. After this training period, recruits are promoted to the position of a police constable. By comparison, US police academies provide an average of 19 weeks of classroom instruction. The prolonged training in Denmark was observed to increase the ability of police to effectively de-escalate conflicts and enact their duties professionally and responsibly.

To keep police officers accountable and to ensure that they perform their duties in compliance with Danish, European and international laws, the Independent Police Complaints Authority has the power to handle criminal investigations against police officers and determine complaints of police misconduct. This body is independent of both the police and prosecutors. For example, police

"[...] may use force only if necessary and justified and only by such means and to such extent as are reasonable relative to the interest which the police seek to protect. Any assessment of the justification of such force must also take into account whether the use of force involves any risk of bodily harm to third parties."

— Act on Police Activities (2004),

Therefore, police in Denmark are held to high standards and will face consequences if they breach their obligations to encourage compliance. Victims of police misconduct are encouraged to lodge a report with the Authority.

=== Estonia ===
The Estonian Police force was temporarily dissolved in 1940 when Estonia lost its independence to the Soviet Union after it was occupied, before the Police Act passed in 1990 dissolved the Soviet militsiya and re-established it. In 2010, the Public Order Police, Police Board, Central Criminal Police, Border Guard, Citizenship, and Migration Board merged into the Police and Border Guard Board. It is the largest state agency in Estonia with over 5000 people in employment. The main objectives for this organisation are to maintain security and public order, crime prevention, detection and investigation, securing the European Union (EU) border, citizenship and identity documentation administration.

The Estonian Ministry of Justice reports that crime figures dropped by 10% from 2013 to 2015. They instruct that those who find themselves detained by the police should comply with their instructions and those who experience a language barrier are allowed to "request the presence of an interpreter and should not sign any documents or reports until they are confident that the document's contents are consistent with the details of the incident or the victim's statement".

Incidents of police abuse are very rare. Although uncommon, powers are sometimes abused which leads to police brutality, such as the 2007 Bronze Soldier riots.

==== Bronze Night ====
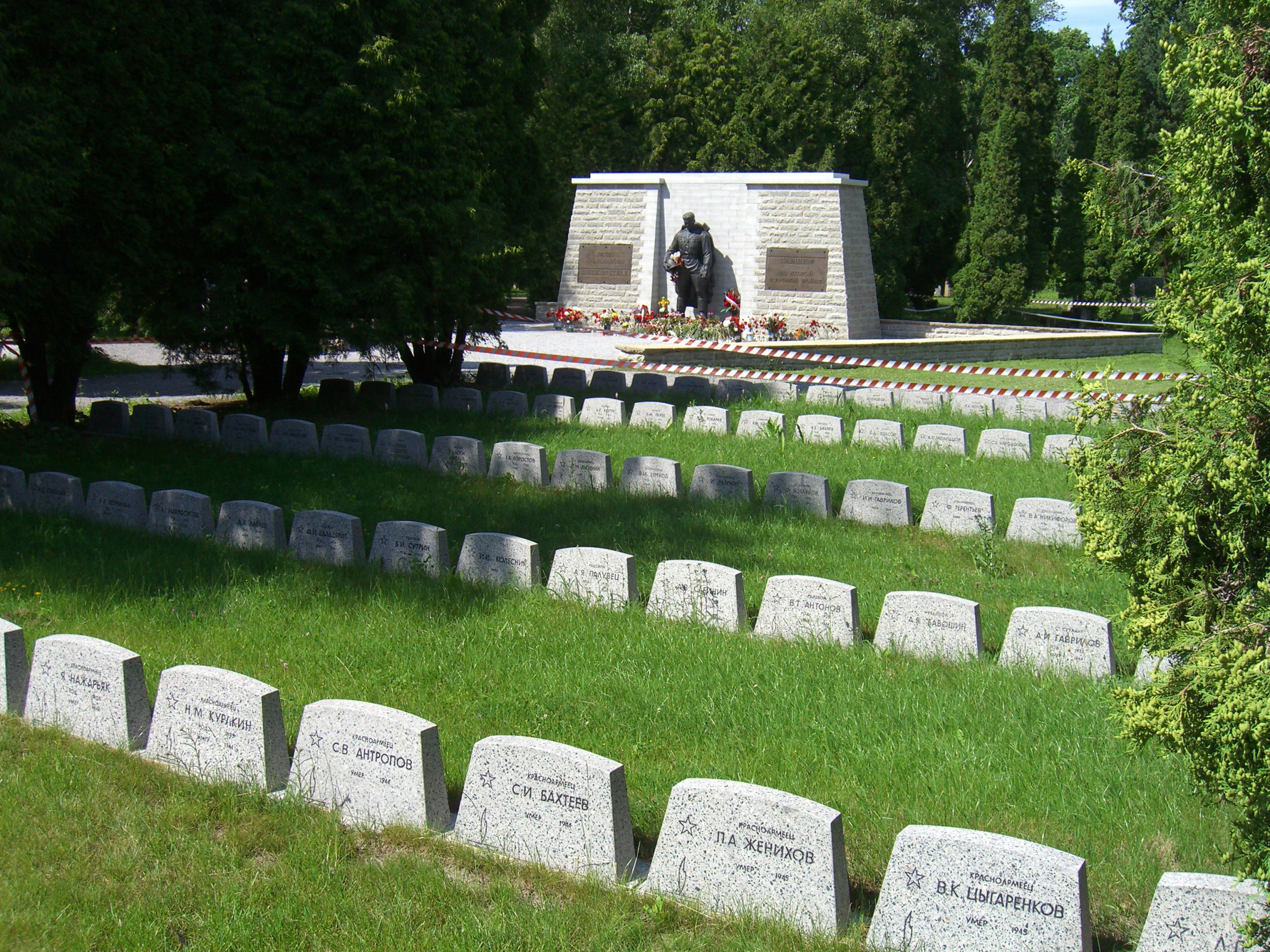
The Bronze Soldier of Tallinn in its new location

The Bronze Night occurred from 26 to 29 April 2007, when riots broke out over the Bronze Soldier of Tallinn being relocated. The government wanted to relocate the statue and rebury the associated remains near the Tallinn Military Cemetery; the response was heavily negative among the country's Russophone population, but for Estonians historically the Bronze Soldier served as a symbol of Soviet occupation and repression. For Russian citizens, it represented Soviet Russia's victory over Germany in World War II and their claim to equal rights in Estonia.

One Russian rioter was killed and other protesters were arrested. Due to the overcrowded detention centres, many of the detainees were taken to cargo terminals in Tallinn's seaport. Then-chairman of the Constitution Party Andrei Zarenkov stated "people were forced to squat for hours or lie on the concrete floor with their hands tied behind their backs. The police used plastic handcuffs which caused great pain. The police selectively beat the detainees including women and teenagers. We have pictures of a toilet which is stained with the blood of the injured".

The police department denied all claims made against them. On 22 May 2007, the Office of Prosecutor General of Estonia received more than fifty complaints on the police brutality that occurred during Bronze Night and opened seven criminal cases against them. In November 2007, the United Nations Committee against torture expressed concerns over the use of excessive force and brutality by law enforcement personnel in regards to Bronze Night. The Council of Europe published in its report that those detained were not granted all the fundamental safeguards, including the right to a doctor or a lawyer, and to inform a relative or a third party of their arrest. It was later discovered that the accused were only allowed outside contact and lawyer assistance when brought before a judge. Several detainees were denied access to a doctor while in police custody despite displaying visible injuries.

=== France ===
The policing structure of the nineteenth century France has been linked to the outcomes of France's reorganisation during the French Revolution. There have been multiple instances of violent enforcement stemming from issues around racial and geographic differences throughout France's history. Additionally, the Human Rights Watch and Amnesty International reported human rights violations by France including physical and psychological abuse as a result of excessive force towards Muslims when undertaking house raids.

France's police ombudsman was dealing with 48 judicial inquiries into police brutality against its citizens in 2017, in which 1,000 individuals have been arrested within three months. There have been several high-profile cases of alleged police brutality which have gained media attention, including the death of Lamine Dieng on 17 June 2007, who died after suffocating in a police van while he was constrained. The investigation of Lamine's death is ongoing. Grey areas around police accountability have come to light, including questions over how his body was covered in bruises and whether or not carotid restraint (which involves constricting the carotid arteries) was used against him. The European Court of Human Rights condemned France in 1998 for their apparent use of carotid constriction. This same method of restraint was seen to be used against Hakim Ajimi who died of positional asphyxia as a result of overwhelming pressure being placed on his chest and neck by police.

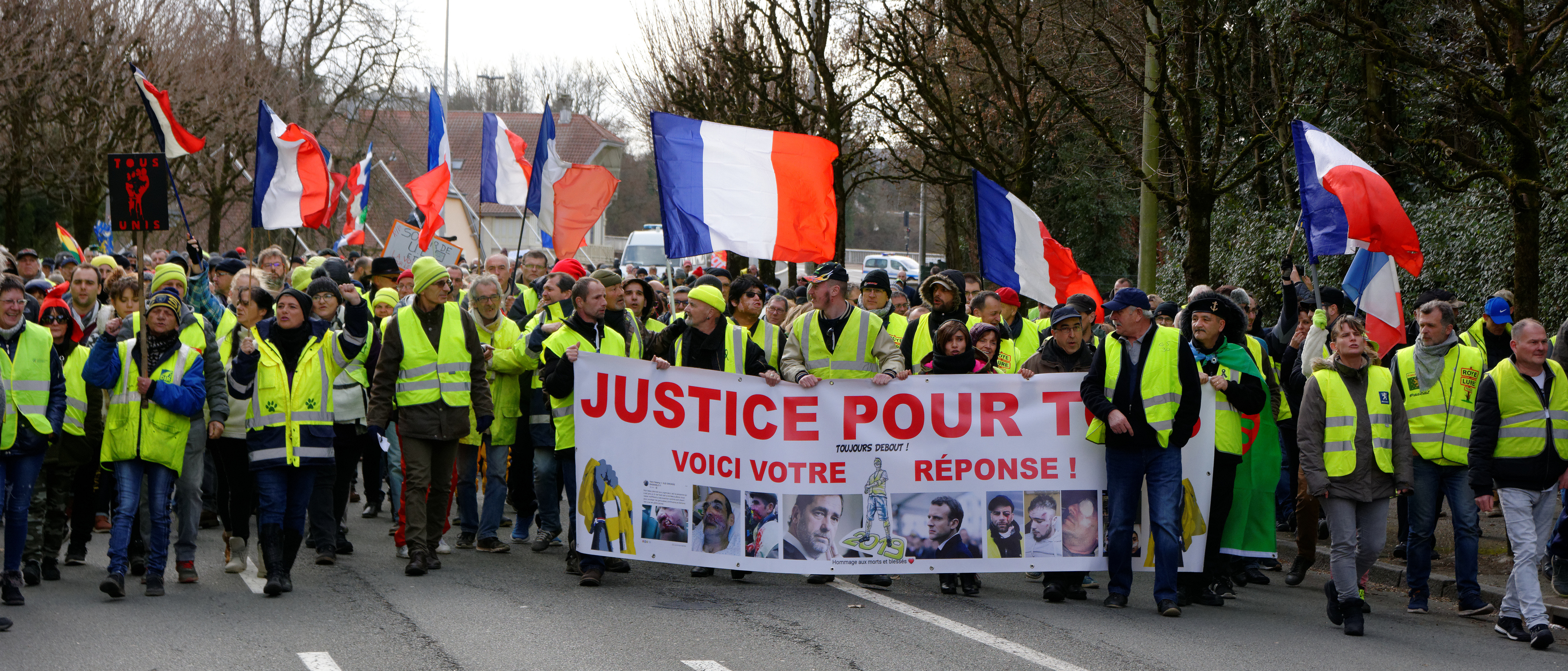
Yellow vests protesters holding a sign referring to victims of police violence, 9 February 2019

Protests over disputed labor laws have revealed the extreme nature of police brutality in France, as many videos have surfaced in the media depicting police using disproportionate force on protesters. French officials have forced these aggressive videos to be destroyed.

A group known as the Stolen Lives Collective formed in response to the increased number of cases of police brutality in French communities. It represents families of those who have been affected by police brutality. The group strongly demands the government to act against police brutality and to reduce racism present across the police force in France.

On 14 December 2018, Amnesty International reported police brutality during the yellow vests movement. France's yellow vests protests began against an increased fuel tax made by President Emmanuel Macron. Participation in the weekly protests diminished due to violence, particularly due to the loss of eyes and hands, and the development of neurological disorders caused by police blast balls. The protests eventually stopped due to the COVID-19 pandemic but continued again after health restrictions lifted.

In June 2023, a series of riots began after Nahel Merzouk, a 17-year-old French youth of Algerian descent, was shot at point-blank range and killed by a police officer when he did not comply with an order to stop and instead attempted to drive away, in Nanterre, a suburb of Paris.

On 21 June 2026, a police officer in Carcassonne was filmed throwing a 29-year-old man, identified as Youssef E., to the ground during an intervention. Following the publication of the footage in September, the Carcassonne prosecutor's office referred the case to the General Inspectorate of the National Police (IGPN) for a judicial investigation into alleged intentional violence by a public authority. On 3 July 2026, thirteen days after the incident, Youssef E. died. The prosecutor's office stated that, based on the investigation and autopsy findings, no causal link had been established between the police intervention and his death.

On 5 October 2026, During nationwide student protests in France, a teenager lost his hand in an explosion. Human rights groups have also accused the French police of using violent tactics against minors, including the use of batons, tear gas, and flash-ball guns. The French Ministry of Justice also announced that 5,060 people have been arrested since the protests began, 87% of whom were underage.

=== Finland ===
Historically, police brutality was commonplace during the 1920s and 1930s following the Finnish Civil War. Some local sections of the secret police (Etsivä Keskuspoliisi) routinely beat up arrested communists.

In 2006, there were 7,700 police officers in Finland. That police force was seen to be more law-abiding than firemen; however, a few dozen cases each year involved police officers being convicted of crimes committed while on duty, 5 to 10 percent of the hundreds of similar crimes prosecuted annually. The number of these crimes were shown to increase annually. Police officers are most often suspected of traffic-related crimes (endangering road safety, vehicular collisions, etc.) which constitute approximately 50% of all cases. These types of cases were the most likely to be dismissed before proceeding to the prosecutor for consideration. The second-highest category (approximately 20%) involving police is the use of excessive force which, except for of some off-duty petty assaults (which includes a slap on the cheek), proceed to the prosecutor without fail.

In 2006, a 51-year-old police constable lured a 16-year-old girl to his house by showing her his badge, where he got her drunk and raped her twice. The constable was fired and sentenced to a two-year suspended sentence. In 2007, an Iranian-born immigrant, Rasoul Pourak, was beaten in a cell at Pasila Police Station, Helsinki, inflicting bruises all over Pourak's body, an open wound over his eyebrow, and a fractured skull. Facial bones were also broken and he was left permanently damaged. One guard participating in the assault was sentenced to an 80-day suspended prison sentence. In 2010, two police officers assaulted a man in a wheelchair in connection with an arrest. The police twisted the man's hands and pushed him backward and broke a femur in the process. In 2013, two policemen were sentenced to 35 day-fines for assault and breach of duty in connection with stomping on a Romani man's head onto the asphalt three times. According to the police, he had resisted, contrary to eyewitness accounts. A third officer testified that the event was captured on surveillance video, which was stored but accidentally destroyed. The officer also stated that they had seen the footage and claimed that the video did not show any resistance on the part of the victim, but also that the assault happened out of the camera's view.

=== Germany ===
Germany is sensitive towards its history in implementing policing practices, though this has not stopped international bodies from identifying a clear pattern of police ill-treatment of foreigners and members of ethnic minorities. Every year, around 2,000 complaints of police brutality are reported, though it is highly suspected that the actual number of cases is under-reported. As high-profile cases like the 2014 Cologne New Year's Eve incident become more prevalent, racist and xenophobic attitudes have been reflected in instances of police brutality. In 2025, United Nation experts on human rights urged Germany to halt criminalisation and police violence against Palestinian solidarity activism.

High profile cases of police brutality have been reported to occur as far back as the 1960s:

- 2 June 1967: Benno Ohnesorg was shot and killed by a policeman during a demonstration against the state visit of the Shah of Iran, Mohammad Reza Pahlavi.
- 28 May 1999: Sudanese national Aamir Ageeb died of asphyxia during his forced deportation from Frankfurt. Before departure, Ageeb was forcibly restrained by tape and rope. During take-off, police officers allegedly forced his head and upper body between his knees.
- 8 December 2000: Josef Hoss was accused by his neighbour (a police officer) of harbouring firearms; he was ambushed, beaten, and handcuffed near his home. He woke up in the police station with a cloth bag over his head and sustained multiple injuries that prevented him from working or being able to financially support his family. No firearms were found during the investigation.
- May 2002: Stephan Neisius was repeatedly kicked and hit by a group of police officers while he was handcuffed on the floor of a police station. He spent 13 days in hospital on life support before dying. Although the Cologne District Court convicted all six police officers of bodily harm resulting in death, none of the accused served prison sentences.
- 2012: Teresa Z. called the police after a fight with her boyfriend got out of hand but was quickly arrested. She was punched by police officer Frank W. and received a broken nose and eye socket while in detention. Frank W. spent ten months in jail and was forced to pay a fine of 3,000 euros.

As law enforcement is vested solely with the states of Germany, each state's police force (or "Land" police) follows a different system of law. Accordingly, there is an absence of a federal comprehensive register, compiling and publishing regular, uniform, and comprehensive figures on complaints about police ill-treatment. Even though Germany is bound to obligate its many international treaties and conventions, Amnesty International (2002) highlights the authorities failed to protect a range of human rights as guaranteed by international human rights law and standards. A study conducted in 2019 on police brutality in Germany found that it led to complaints in only 9%, and trials in only 13% of the cases. The study was conducted by the Ruhr-University of Bochum and was the biggest study at the time to be conducted on police brutality in Germany. The study found that the low number of complaints was likely due to a low expectation of success. Furthermore, most German states do not require their police force to carry identification, making it difficult for victims to lodge complaints against individuals. Watchdog organizations have also criticized the lack of independent institutions for investigations into police violence.

Despite this objective lack of accountability for policing practice, public levels of trust in police remain among the highest in the EU only behind Scandinavian countries and Switzerland. This allows Germany to maintain one of the lowest levels of public order and safety spending in the EU, at 1.5 percent of gross domestic profit, compared to the EU average of 1.8 percent. As a result, Germany has a police force of only 300 officers per 100,000 of its population. Lower numbers exist in Scandinavian countries and the UK, suggesting that Germany is attempting to build the impression of having a more laissez-faire approach to policing, despite instances of police brutality. German police officers rarely use their guns; as of August 2017, 109 deaths by service weapons since 1998 were reported, and only 8 fatalities in the two years before the report.

=== Greece ===
The Greek Police, known officially as the Hellenic Police, assumed their current structure in 1984 as a result of merging the Gendarmerie (Chorofylaki) and the Urban Police Forces (Astynomia Poleon). Composed of central and regional departments, the Hellenic Police have a relatively long history of police brutality. One of the first documented incidents dates back to 1976, where 16-year-old activist Sideris Isidoropoulos was killed by police while he put up campaign posters on a public building. In 1980, during a demonstration commemorating the Athens Polytechnic uprising, 20-year-old protester Stamatina Kanelopoulou and 24-year-old Iakovos Koumis were beaten to death by the Greek police. The protests still occur to this day for protesters to commemorate the 1973 uprising. The protests are still commonly affected by police brutality around the time of the event. On 17 November 1985 another protester, 15-year-old Michalis Kaltezas, was murdered by the police during the demonstration commemorating the Polytechnic uprising.

The level and severity of police brutality in Greece over the last few years have been profound. Due to the recent financial crisis, many austerity measures have been enforced, resulting in many individuals and families struggling to survive. Greek citizens opposed these austerity measures from the beginning and showed their disapproval with strikes and demonstrations. In response, police brutality has significantly increased, with consistent reports on the use of tear gas, severe injuries inflicted by the police force, and unjustified detention of protesters.

In 2013 Greek police allegedly tortured four young men believed to be bank robbery suspects following their arrest. It was claimed that the men were hooked and severely beaten in detention. The media published photos of the men, all with severe bruising, though the police's press release showed digitally manipulated photos of the four without injuries. The Greek minister of citizen protection—Nikos Dendias—supported the police and claimed that they needed to use Photoshop to ensure the suspects were recognisable. In October 2012, 15 anti-fascist protesters were arrested in Athens when they clashed with supporters of the fascist party (and later deemed a criminal organization) "Golden Dawn". Victims claimed they were tortured while being held at the Attica General Police Directorate and stated that police officers slapped them, spat on them, burnt their arms with cigarette lighters, and kept them awake with flashlights and lasers. Dendias countered by accusing the British newspaper that published the details of these crimes of libel. It was proven by forensic examination that the torture had taken place. The two Greek journalists who commented on The Guardian report the next day were fired.

Police brutality in Greece today predominantly manifests itself in the form of unjustified and extreme physical violence towards protesters and journalists. Amnesty International highlights that the continued targeting of journalists is concerning as it infringes on the right to freedom of expression. According to a recent Amnesty International report, there have been multiple instances in which police have used excessive brutal force, misused less-lethal weapons against protesters, attacked journalists, and subjected bystanders to ill-treatment, particularly over the course of the anniversary of the Athens Polytechnic uprising, which took place on 17 November 2014. Allegations against police have emerged specifically concerning their use of unprovoked brutal force towards journalists documenting the demonstration and against many students who partook in a peaceful protest. Police allegedly sprayed protesters with chemical irritants from close range – in one instance a 17-year-old girl with asthma had been treated in the hospital after this attack and when she informed police of her condition they laughed.

Video footage confirmed that on 13 November 2014, riot police began to strike students who attempted to run away from the grounds of Athens Polytechnic. Media reports suggest that around 40 protesters had to seek subsequent medical attention to injuries sustained from brutal police beatings. Amnesty International called for action to prosecute those who were behind the assaults, stating that within the Greek police there is a culture of "abuse and impunity" which remains as authorities have taken very little action to address the root of the problem.

A German exchange student said he was beaten randomly by riot police in the Exarheia district, stating his only reason for being there was that he was eating with other students. The student gave a horrifying description of the violence he endured and cowered in a corner when he saw police because a few weeks before he had witnessed police beating a man they had arrested. He claimed that upon spotting him, about six police officers began assaulting him with their batons, and when they left they were replaced by another group of police. The student was unarmed and posed no threat but the police were ruthlessly brutal in their actions. It has been indicated that riot police left beaten and gravely injured individuals without any medical assistance. Amnesty International urges Greece to effectively and promptly investigate these crimes against civilians, which violate human rights, and hold perpetrators accountable.

- May 2011: student Yannis Kafkas suffered an almost fatal head injury after a police officer hit him with a fire extinguisher. Kafkas spent 20 days in intensive care.
- June 2011: Manolis Kipraios, journalist, was covering protests against austerity measures when a member of the riot police fired a stun grenade at him and caused him to suffer from permanent hearing loss.
- February 2012: photojournalist Marios Lolos had to have surgery done after being beaten in the head by police at a protest. The day before this attack another journalist Rena Maniou was allegedly severely beaten by security forces. Dimitris Trimis, the head of The Greek Journalist Association (ESEA) broke his arm after he was violently pushed and kicked by police.

There have been instances where protesters were used as human shields – a photo of a female protester in handcuffs ahead of policeman as people threw rocks at the police has gained considerable media attention.

None of the cases of police brutality above resulted in any prosecution of police force members. One case that sparked nationwide riots was the death of 15-year-old Alexis Grigoropoulos, who was shot dead by a police officer in December 2008 during demonstrations in Athens, sparkling large riots against police brutality. Unlike other cases, the police officer responsible was convicted of murder.

=== Hungary ===
In 2008 when Hungary's two law enforcement bodies, the police (Rendőrség) and the Border Guards merged when the nation signed the Schengen Agreement; Border Guards became police officers. The police force in Hungary consists of the National Bureau of Investigation and the Operational Police, who respectively deal with investigating severe crimes and riot suppression. A third police group, Terrorelhárítási Központ, which deals mainly with counter-terrorism nationwide, also exists. 44,923 employees make up the Rendőrség force in Hungary. Brutality and corruption exist within Rendőrség.

The 1998 Human Rights Watch World Report revealed that the Roma minority in Hungary were continually discriminated against. It was evident in the police force, with reports of police mistreatment and brutality.

The 2006 protests in response to Prime Minister Ferenc Gyurcsány's speech where he said that the Socialist Party lied their way into office demonstrated the disproportionate measures police took particularly police brutality on non-violent civilians. Police threw gas grenades and used rubber bullets to shoot protesters. Protesters and non-violent civilians passing by were targeted, tackled, and injured by the police. Police broke the fingers of a handcuffed man and raided restaurants and bars to find radical demonstrators. Police brutality ranged from offensive language to physically attacking protesters. Reports show that brutality extended to bypassers, tourists, news reporters, and paramedics.

To prevent further police ill-treatment, the Independent Police Complaints Board was established in 2008, but since 2010, its role had been diminished until being completely eliminated in 2020. Police brutality is an issue even today, and its victims have a hard time proving their case: according to the Hungarian Helsinki Committee, an NGO standing up against injustice by the authorities, only 4% of the victims make out a case against the police (while 69% do so when the victim is a police officer). In average, only 3-6 percent of reports lead to a prosecution of abusive police, of which only 2-4 are convicted.

Violent migrant pushbacks on the Hungarian-Serbian border are even more prevalent, systemic, and explicitly encouraged by the Hungarian government: only in 2022, 150,000 pushback cases were recorded by the police (often after beating up their victims - even children - and setting dogs on them). This practice has even been condemned by the European Court of Human Rights: its 2022 verdict ruled that it violates the prohibition of collective expulsions and the right to remedy.

Hungarian Spectrum blogger Eva S. Bologh suggest that rather than acting reactively, Hungary should work to improve their police training programs and work to provide ongoing training and assessments to ensure that police officers in the Rendőrség, are competent and fair in their ethical judgements when it comes to the proportionality of a crime or situation and the use of force. The requirements to become a police officer in Hungary are to graduate from high school, pass a matriculation exam, and complete two years in the police academy. Compared to other countries around the world, the two-year program is shorter than Denmark's (3-year program), and longer than Australia's (33-week program) and the United States' (18 weeks). The current two-year program is quite lengthy, however, time is not the issue. Most of what the Hungarian police academy teaches is academic theory and not much on practice. If practical work was given more attention in the Hungarian police academy, the number of police brutality incidents would likely decrease.

=== Ireland ===
==== Northern Ireland (UK) ====
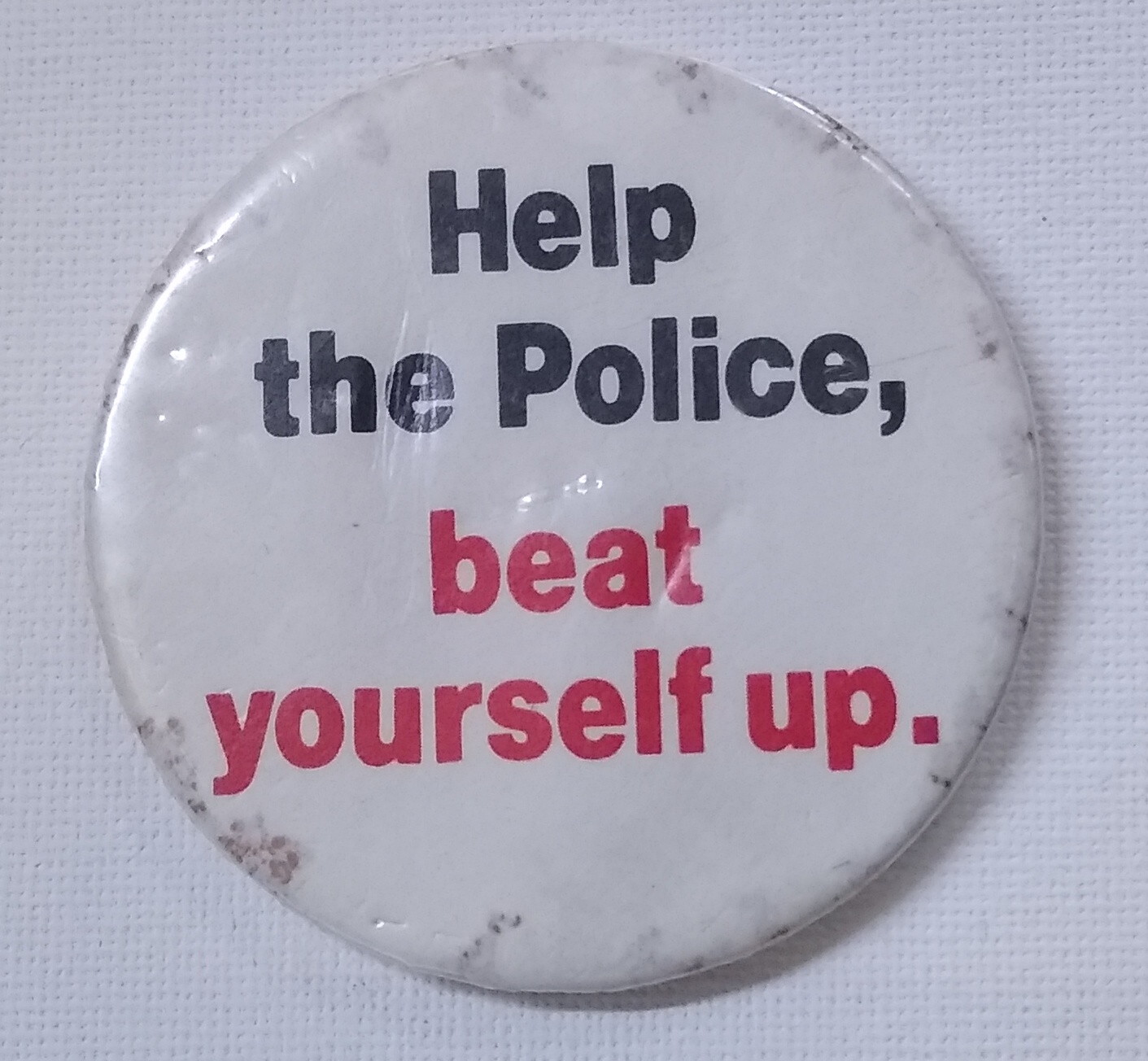
A pin from Northern Ireland that reads "Help the Police, beat yourself up."

Police brutality has been a long-standing issue in Northern Ireland due to unsavoury police procedures used during the Troubles to obtain admissions of guilt. The Troubles in Northern Ireland lasted from 1968 until 2007 and were essentially a civil war between those who wanted Northern Ireland to remain in the United Kingdom (unionists/loyalists, predominantly Protestants) and those who did not (Irish nationalists/republicans, predominantly Catholics). During this time as many as 50,000 people were physically maimed or injured, some by the Police Service of Northern Ireland (PSNI, previously called Royal Ulster Constabulary). Instances of Northern Irish Police brutality were confirmed by the 1978 report from the European Court of Human Rights, which concluded that five interrogation techniques used by the police, which included wall standing, deprivation of food, drink or sleep, subjection to noise, and forcing detainees to remain in the same position for hours, were instances of cruel and degrading treatment. Such brutality was not recognized by domestic courts until 2010, where 113 people, some of them minors, came forward to have their complaints heard.

At present Northern Ireland still faces policing issues, though not to the extent during the Troubles. There are concerns about harassment by police against children aged 14–18 in low socio-economic areas of Northern Ireland which have led to a deep level of mistrust between the youth and the police. Catholics in Northern Ireland find that they are treated differently by police due to the police force being largely Protestant. 48% of Catholics that were surveyed in Northern Ireland reported harassment by the police. Instances of harassment include police officials spitting on individuals or enforcing laws in a discriminatory fashion. The PSNI has moved away from police brutality given the focus on accountability for the past and the significant decrease in the use of the baton amongst police members (guns are rarely used); however, harassment continues to be a key issue for Northern Ireland.

==== Republic of Ireland ====
The Republic of Ireland's police force is called the Garda Síochána (Garda) and employs around 14,500 staff. Ireland's criminal laws allow "reasonable force" to be used by the police with regard to all the circumstances, which alludes to officers actions being proportionate in the circumstances. Excessive use of force is unlawful, though section 76(7) of the Criminal Justice and Immigration Act 2008 allows the following considerations when deciding on what force is reasonable. A person acting for a legitimate purpose may not be able to weigh up the exact necessary action at the time or may act instinctively but honestly – in these instances, the use of force may be considered reasonable.

This is acknowledged by the Garda, who state: "Unfortunately, even in the most civilised democratic jurisdictions, tragedies resulting from police use of force will continue to devastate families and communities".

The use of force by Irish Police officers has been of international concern, when the European Committee for the Prevention of Torture reported on this issue in the Republic three times within a decade. Incidents that prompted this concern centred around the death of John Carty, a man suffering from mental illness who was shot and killed by police; the prosecution of seven Garda police members due to assaults on protesters in 2002 and in 2005; and a fifteen-year-old boy who died after spending time in Garda custody. Given this state of events, the Garda engaged independent Human Rights experts to conduct a review of the force who found numerous deficiencies. The government responded by implementing new procedures based on this report. These include a new complaints procedure available against the Garda (Ombudsman Commission), disciplinary procedures and whistle-blowing protections.

=== Italy ===
The use of excessive violence by police officers has been a major concern in Italy since the 2000s. Beatings and violence are commonly used during demonstrations, and several murders have been carried out. The following incidents caused concern in the country:

- On 11 July 2001, 23-year-old student Carlo Giuliani was killed by police officers when they opened fire on a group of protesters during the anti-globalization demonstration outside the July 2001 G8 summit. 25-year-old police officer Mario Placanica was considered to be responsible for Giuliani's death but was not charged. Placanica asserted that he was being used as a scapegoat to cover up for the responsible parties and that other officers caused Giuliani's death, shooting at Giuliani from a nearby location. Nobody was arrested for Giuliani's murder.
- On 11 July 2003, Marcello Lonzi, aged 29, was beaten and tortured to death in his cell. Lonzi was arrested in the city of Livorno four months prior, as he was suspected of carrying out an attempted theft. Although his death was considered to be caused by "a heart attack after a fall", signs of torture were found on his body. Nobody was arrested for Lonzi's death.
- On 25 September 2005 in Ferrara, at around 5 a.m., a woman called police claiming that she saw "a strange man walking around". The man, 18-year-old Federico Aldrovandi, who had spent the night in Bologna before returning to Ferrara, was stopped by four policemen. The four officers then began to beat and torture Aldrovandi, killing him at the scene. The officers were arrested and sentenced to three years and six months in prison.
- On 27 October 2006 in Trieste, 34-year-old schizophrenic Riccardo Rasman was launching firecrackers to celebrate his recent employment as a waste collector. Police were called by a resident as he heard suspected shots (which were the firecrackers' noise). Four police officers stormed the house, beating Rasman. The man was hit with iron objects and gagged. The officer pressed their knee on his neck and back, causing Rasman to die of asphyxia. The four officers were sentenced to just six months of prison.
- On 14 October 2007 in Pietralunga, 44-year-old carpenter Aldo Bianzino and his wife, Roberta Radici, were arrested for a handful of marijuana plants at their home. Bianzino stated that the plants were for personal use. When the couple arrived at a police station, they were separated. Two days later, an officer approached Radici in her cell and asked her if her husband has heart problems. Radici responded that Aldo never had health issues and was in good condition, and demanded to know why the officer had asked her the question. The officer responded that Aldo Bianzino had been brought to the hospital in serious condition. Three hours later, Radici was freed from her cell and inquired as to when she could see Aldo. The officer callously responded: "after the autopsy." During Bianzino's autopsy, several signs of violence emerged, including broken ribs, damage to the liver and spleen, and several bruises. A policeman was sentenced in 2015 to a year in prison for lack of assistance. Roberta Radici died of cancer in 2008.
- On 11 November 2007 near Arezzo, a group of five friends, including 27-year-old Gabriele Sandri, were in a car headed to a football match between Inter and S.S. Lazio. The five men, supporters of S.S. Lazio, were stopped by a car of Juventus supporters, and a fight erupted. Policeman Luigi Spaccarotella intervened and opened fire, killing Gabriele Sandri with a single gunshot wound to his neck. The policeman was sentenced to nine years and five months in prison. However, he was freed in 2017 with semi-liberty.
- On 14 June 2008 in Varese, Giuseppe Uva was stopped along with his friend Alberto Bigigoggero by two police officers, who demanded to see the two men's documents. Uva refused, angrily kicking at the door of a nearby house. Other police officers arrived at the scene and arrested Uva and Bigigoggero. Uva died the next morning. Signs of violence were on Uva's body, and Bigigoggero confirmed that Uva had been tortured. Attorney general Massimo Gaballo asked for ten years of imprisonment for each of the eight officers involved in Uva's death. However, none of the officers were charged. Uva's sister insisted that her brother was murdered, receiving support from Luigi Manconi, who promised to fight for the truth.
- On 15 October 2009 in Rome, 31-year-old Stefano Cucchi was stopped by five policemen after they had seen him selling transparent packaging to a man in exchange for money. Cucchi was arrested and brought to a police station, where officers found cocaine and hashish in his pocket, along with medicine for epilepsy, as Cucchi was affected by the disease. Cucchi was described by officers as "a homeless foreigner", but he was an Italian who resided regularly at a home in Rome. Cucchi was beaten before his trial, which led him to walk with fatigue and with evident punch-inflicted injuries to his eyes. A week later, his condition worsened, as he continued to be tortured in custody, resulting in several fractures and a stay in the hospital. Cucchi died at the hospital on 22 October. Stefano's sister Ilaria became an activist since her brother's death, bringing national attention to the case and continuing to fight for justice. In 2019, two officers, Alessio di Bernardo and Raffaele d'Alessandro were sentenced to twelve years in jail for manslaughter.
- On 22 July 2020 in Piacenza, seven Carabinieri were arrested after being accused of drug trafficking, receiving stolen goods, extortion, illegal arrest, torture, grievous bodily harm, embezzlement, abuse of office, and fraud. The "leader" of the group, officer Montella, arrested and charged people with fake proof of crimes that the detainees never committed, placing in the pockets of the people in custody the drugs that he smuggled. A Moroccan man was illegally arrested by the seven officers; the man accused Montella of punching him several times while in custody and reported that the officer laughed during the torture. Montella later admitted that he carried out the torture after initially trying to accuse only his colleagues. However, many other cases of torture inside the police station and outside during arrests were reported, as in the case of a Nigerian man who was approached by Montella; a photo of the man was taken during the arrest, showing him covered with blood. Montella claimed that the man "had a fall" during the arrest; however, prosecutors did not believe Montella's version of the events. A Brazilian woman accused marshal Orlando, one of the charged officers, of being forced to have sex with him through blackmail and intimidation, as the marshal threatened to have her deported back to Brazil. The woman was also beaten at the police station by Orlando; she reported that the seven officers consumed cocaine inside the police station several times, and orgies with prostitutes happened there; Orlando was the one who brought the drugs inside the station. Several prostitutes were also beaten and threatened by the officers. The seven officers were sentenced between three and twelve years in prison.
- On 1 July 2021, 52 prison guards were arrested and suspended on the charges of aggravated torture, aggravated ill-treatment and causing multiple injuries to a group of prisoners, who had demanded better COVID-19 protections, at the Santa Maria Capua Vetere prison in the province of Caserta on 6 April 2020. A video footage emerged in which there were shocking scenes of prisoners being kicked, slapped and beaten with truncheons. This happened after a riot erupted in the prison as inmates demanded face masks and Covid-19 tests in reaction to an outbreak of the virus. The inmates were allegedly made to strip, kneel and be beaten by guards who wore helmets to conceal their identity.

=== Latvia ===
Latvia became an independent republic in 1918 and attempted to develop an effective and accepted police force, moving away from the untrusted Russian Tsarist administration. Despite positive post-independence aims to reform the police system and to maintain public order and security, the Latvian police were underfunded and under-resourced. The National Militia was created in response, consisting of a group of volunteers to protect public order. Policing during this period was quite successful and was assimilated to what is today referred to as community policing.

From 1940 to 1991, Latvia was occupied by the Soviet Union, and all previous regulations and practices were overruled by the Communist regime, which brought in the Soviet militsiya. Due to Soviet ideals on policing that considered criminals to be the enemy, a high level of institutional secrecy existed and meant that there was no independent review of policing. More significantly, the approach of community policing was replaced with a militarised authority based on Marxist ideologies. During this time, an imbalance existed between police actions and citizens' rights. Despite the lack of statistics, it is clear that police brutality was a major issue, as ustrated by the case where the former nominal head of the militsiya (in practice - the secret police of the KGB of the Latvian SSR) Alfons Noviks was sentenced to life imprisonment in this time period for genocide against the Latvian people.

In 1991, the independence of the state of Latvia was restored, which saw another change in the police system with the implementation of the Law on Police on 5 June. This restructured the police into State, Security, and Local Government levels. The Law on Police reiterated ethical requirements, where police officers were prohibited from performing or supporting acts relating to "torture or other cruel, inhuman or demeaning treatment or punishment". However, despite these reforms, issues regarding police brutality arose among the Russian population living in Latvia; in 1998, police forces were accused of dispersing a rally of predominately Russian pensioners through the use of excessive force and brutality. This hostility towards Russians remained in the following years, and despite lack of official statistics, police brutality continued to be an issue after Latvia's independence.

In 2005, the Latvian Center for Human Rights and Ethnic Studies (LCHRES) found some instances of brutality and "severe abuse" within police authorities, especially on persons in custody. Reports showed high levels of corruption within Latvian law enforcement authorities, with 42 members convicted of corruption offences between 2003 and 2004. For the Latvian community, this meant that should an incident of police brutality occur, they may not have an independent body to report to nor is it guaranteed to be handled impartially without corruption.

Reports from Latvian prisons illustrate cases where police batons were used to inflict serious harm to inmates, including causing broken ribs, which often were not medically assessed for up to two days. To address levels of police brutality, LCHRES conducted a study where it set up an anonymous hotline. During this four-day study, LCHRES received almost 300 calls and written complaints regarding police brutality and misconduct. This identifies fundamental flaws in the Latvian police authorities.

Since joining the European Union in 2004, the European Committee for the Prevention of Torture (CPT) has assessed the Latvian criminal justice system several times. While the CPT gives appropriate authorities recommendations for improvements such as a review board for ill-treatment, they found that in 2011, Latvian authorities did not enact any of their 2007 recommendations. Their 2011 report outlined some cases of police brutality within the prison system, with allegations such as punching, kicking and a few cases of misuse of police batons and excessively tight handcuffing. This was alleged to occur mostly while being apprehended or at the police station (including during questioning).

Despite the flaws within the Latvian Police system, CPT has found that the number of allegations for poor treatment is decreasing over the years. The Latvian Police force operates under the Professional Ethics and Conduct Code of the State Police Personnel, which states "a police officer shall use force, special facilities or weapon only in the cases stipulated by due course of law and to attain a legal aim. The use of spontaneous or -intentioned force, special facilities or weapon shall not be justified", recognising that the authorities are conscious of police brutality, and given more time, it is likely that the figures will continue to decrease.

=== Luxembourg ===
The Luxembourg Police force has 1,603 officers and is known as the "Grand Ducal Police". The Grand Ducal Police is the primary law enforcement agency in Luxembourg and has been operating since 1 January 2000, when the Grand Ducal Gendarmerie (previous Luxembourg military) merged with the police force. Due to Luxembourg's relatively small population of approximately 500,000 people, the Grand Ducal Police are in charge of several duties that are often separated by jurisdictions such as Border Control and Internal Military operations.

Police brutality is not perceived to be a serious threat to society in Luxembourg. The European Union's 2014 Anti-Corruption report placed Luxembourg, along with Denmark and Finland, as having the lowest incidents of reported police brutality within the European Union. Due to many positive characteristics of their society, such as freedom of media, the encouragement of public participation in the legal system, and transparency mechanisms, the public also have a deep trust in the Grand Ducal police force.

Laws in Luxembourg specifically distinguish between coercion and force in the 1973 Act on Regulating the Use of Force. This Act regulates the use of police weapons and specific technical means of physical force used by police. However, this Act does not cover other forms of physical coercion by police officers such as the use of handcuffs as these are seen as basic police measures that do not require specific legislation. The officer must be legitimately executing his duty and his actions and must be compatible under the principles of proportionality, subsidiarity, reasonability, and measure to use force. To ensure the Grand Ducal Police do not engage in police brutality, numerous safeguards and prevention methods are implemented. The police inspector (the term used for a common officer) must undergo legal and tactical training lasting an intensive 26 months followed by further training at an allocated police station. By way of comparison, the Victoria Police Academy only provides 33 weeks of tactical and legal training. The 2015 Human Rights Report on Government practices by the United States indicated no cases of police brutality in Luxembourg, suggesting that the Grand Ducal Police have effective mechanisms in place to investigate and punish potential abuse and corruption.

Although police brutality is almost nonexistent in Luxembourg, there are effective procedures in place for the investigation and punishment of any potential misconduct by the Grand Ducal Police.

=== Malta ===
Malta's Police Force (MPF) is one of the oldest in Europe, with the Maltese government taking over the force in 1921 following the grant of self-governance. There are approximately 1,900 members in the Force.

Under the Police Act of 1961, Part V deals with the use of force, where"police officers may use such moderate and proportionate force as may be necessary [...]" (Article 96); however, according to Article 100, "It shall be considered as an offence against discipline if a police officer uses force for considerations extraneous to those permitted by law and the circumstances of the case". As such, Malta recognizes the illegality of police brutality and can prosecute offending officials on these grounds.

Malta is expected to abide by the 2001 European Code of Ethics as a member of the European Union, where "the police may use force only when strictly necessary and only to the extent required to obtain a legitimate objective."

Similarly, the Council of Europe (of which Malta is a member) follows the five principles developed by the European Court of Human Rights, where definition 16 states that police officers "may use reasonable force when lawfully exercising powers".

In 2008, Lawrence Gonzi (The Minister for Justice and Home Affairs) called upon Martin Scicluna, a former civil servant and currently an expert on security issues at the Prime Minister's Office, to conduct an independent inquiry into 24 March 2008 police brutality incident. The inquiry required the investigation of "allegations of beatings carried out on detainees at Safi Detention Centre by members of the Detention Service on 24 March 2008 and to make any recommendations necessary in the light of [his] findings". Following the results of the inquiry of Scicluna, made public by the Maltese Government, it was concluded that "excessive force was used by Detention Service Personnel".

Scicluna made recommendations that "appropriate [action] should be taken to reprimand the Detention Service officers involved in this operation and the relevant Senior NCOs for the acts of 25 excessive force used by some personnel in their charge". Simultaneously, Home Affairs Minister Carm Mifsud Bonnici said "95 percent of the members of the police force were doing their duties, but the remainder needed to be addressed", which led to the establishment of the Internal Affairs Unit (IAU) to "maintain and safeguard the integrity of the Malta Police Force through an internal system of investigation that is objective, fair, equitable, impartial and just", where complaints or allegations on the use of force can be monitored and responded to.

Although Malta has attempted to tackle the police brutality through the implementation of independent systems such as the Internal Affairs Unit (IAU), the US Department of State 2010 report on Malta's human rights found that "authorities detained irregular immigrants under harsh conditions for up to 18 months during the review of their protected status." In addition, the 2013 US Department of State report found that although there were no government reports on the use of brutality in detention centers, on 2 December 2013 media reported the sentencing of two former prison guards to five years in prison and another two guards to three months in prison after finding them guilty of beating an escaped prisoner in 2008, illustrating the gradual development of the IAU in limiting the use of police brutality.

After the IAU was implemented, the Human Rights Committee has raised questions on the use of force by state officials with respect to the countering of detention center riots, where police were accused of punching and striking detainees. An inquiry was consequently conducted in 2011 and 2012 following riots, resulting in criminal proceedings against the law enforcement officials responsible. In addition, Giacomo Santini and Tina Acketoft (The Chairs of the Migration and Equality Committees of the Parliamentary Assembly of the Council of Europe) expressed "grave concern at an increasing number of incidents of state violence against migrants and refugees". They called upon Maltese authorities to conduct a rapid investigation emphasising the need to forbid violence against migrants and refugees, whether by state parties or by individuals.

The Committee on the Elimination of Racial Discrimination, concerning the conditions of migrants in detention, recommended that the "State party take appropriate measures to improve detention conditions and refrain from resorting to excessive use of force to counter riots by immigrants in detention centers, and also to avoid such riot".

==== List of alleged cases ====
| Date | Persons Involved | Description | Resolution |
|---|---|---|---|
| October 2014 | David Calleja | "Ta' Xbiex resident David Calleja, a financial advisor, was driving in the Sliema Strand when he was stopped by police who deemed him to be driving recklessly. The Malta Police Force issued a statement detailing what had happened, in which it claimed that Mr. Calleja acted aggressively, refused to take a breathalyser test, ignored police orders, and used foul language. He was subsequently arrested and taken to a police squad car, but according to the police statement, he kicked the driver, tried to escape and banged his head repeatedly against the car window. The police added that he even spit blood at police officers and bit a constable's arm, tearing off part of his skin. When asked to state his client's plea, Dr. Abela declared "absolutely not guilty," before accusing the police of grossly distorting the truth. Mr. Calleja's nose was bandaged, and Dr. Abela presented a medical certificate showing that it had been broken as evidence. The lawyer also presented his client's blood-stained clothes – prosecuting inspector Jason Sultana originally objected, but relented after Dr. Abela said that this objection was due to the fact that the clothes helped confirm the injuries Mr. Calleja sustained." | "Magistrate Marse-Ann Farrugia ultimately granted bail against a €10,000 personal guarantee, with Mr Calleja's father acting as his guarantor." |
| January 2015 | Not mentioned | "The Commissioner of Police has referred a complaint of police brutality to the Duty Magistrate after a parent wrote to him saying his son was beaten while in police custody. The man said his son was in a bar in Paceville when police went up to him because he was smoking. The man claimed that the police roughly manhandled his son, handcuffed him and threw him into a van where he was beaten up and suffered from lacerations to the head as well as bruised ribs and muscles." | Ongoing inquiry |
| March 2015 | Mifsud Grech | "The police were called in and the customer left the restaurant as soon as he was ordered to. However, once on the pavement, he and two policemen, who in the meantime had been joined by others from the nearby station, were involved in what witnesses called a "commotion". The customer ended up on the ground beneath several officers who were trying to arrest him. He was subsequently charged with threatening the two officers while carrying out their duties, breaching the peace and refusing to give his particulars. He was cleared of the charges." | "In handing down judgment, Magistrate Depasquale said the court was "convinced" that the incident had not happened in the way that the police had alleged. He further noted that the police "may have used excessive force". |
| May 2015 | Jean Paul Aquilina, 24-year-old Mosta man | Aquilina, accused of assaulting policemen after he was pulled over for dangerous driving, struggled to explain how Aquilina suffered severe facial bruising and scratches to his body during the course of his arrest. | Not mentioned |
| February 2016 | 20-year-old Lee Michael Robertson from Xemxija | "Robertson had been attacked whilst at the bar, and had injured his hand. He rushed to the police station, she said, but once he arrived he had been told to clear out of the station and wipe the blood off his hand before going back in. In the ensuing verbal exchange the officer, Defence lawyer Rachel Tua said, made offensive remarks about the accused's father. Robertson was then allegedly thrown to the ground by the officer, who slammed the man's head on the ground, the lawyer said, also claiming that the accused had his injured arm cruelly twisted while he was being handcuffed. She denied the prosecution's assertion that Robertson had assaulted police, adding that his friends had witnessed the incident and would be summoned to testify. Tua told magistrate Vella that the police refused to allow Robertson to speak to her during his arrest, instead of holding him overnight and taking a statement the next morning – with the police officer who allegedly delivered the beating present in the interrogation room. The police had not even told him why he was being arrested, she said." | "The court ruled that the arrest was not illegal and granted Robertson bail against a personal deposit of €1,200 and a personal guarantee of €8,000, also ordering him to sign a bail book once a week and observe a curfew". |

=== Netherlands ===
The Netherlands is signatory to the European Convention on Human Rights detailing the limits and responsibilities of police powers, and as such demonstrates a public commitment to the restricted legal use of police powers. These powers include the use of reasonable force to enable the effective discharge of duties, with the stipulation force be used proportionately and only as a last resort.

The police force of the Netherlands is divided into 25 regional forces and one central force. A Regional Police Board, made up of local mayors and the chief public prosecutor, heads each regional force, with a chief officer placed in charge of police operations. Police accountability procedures include mandatory reporting of any on-duty incident that requires the use of force. The Rijksrecherche is the national agency responsible for the investigation of serious breaches of police conduct resulting in death or injury. In 2007 the Rijksrecherche conducted 67 inquiries related to police officers, 21 of which were related to shootings.

While Dutch society has a history of support for liberal values, it has been subject to practicing racial profiling and increased levels of police violence towards racial minorities. Van der Leun writes that suspicion and mistrust of some racial groups is evident and perpetuated by police attitudes at all levels of command. This trend in police behaviour has drawn comment from Amnesty International, where a 2015 report describes Dutch law enforcement officers as having a tendency to correlate suspicious criminal behaviour with specific ethnic characteristics, most notably those typical of persons of Moroccan heritage. Current political discourse in the Netherlands often supports the notion of inferiority of some cultures and is evidenced by the growth in support for far-right political ideologies in recent decades.

A notable case in racial profiling and the use of police force occurred in June 2015 with the death of Aruban man Mitch Henriquez. Henriquez died of asphyxiation while in police custody after being suspected of carrying a firearm and being arrested at a music festival in The Hague. The first anniversary of his death in June 2016 provided a catalyst for protests against police brutality in The Hague, an area with a significant proportion of residents of non-European background. Eleven protesters were arrested for failing to comply with instructions from the Mayor to limit protest to certain areas of the city, which led some protesters to claim authorities were attempting to criminalize the right to peaceful protest. The five officers alleged to be involved in Hendriquez's death have been suspended but have yet to be charged.

=== Poland ===
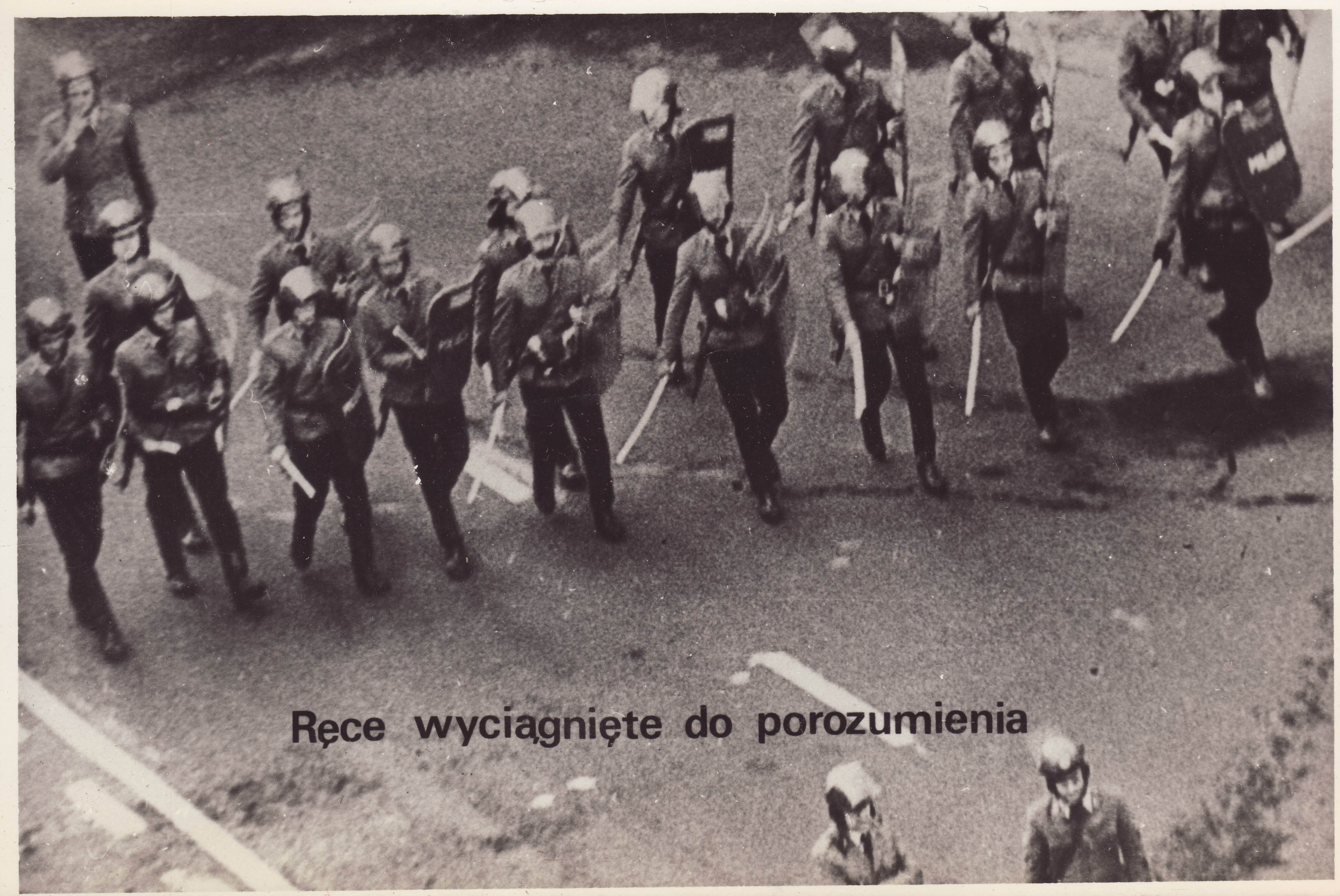
Polish ZOMO squads with police batons during martial law in Poland, 1981–1983. The sarcastic caption reads "outstretched hands of understanding" or "outstretched hands for agreement".

The Polish police (Policja) force aims to "serve and protect the people, and to maintain public order and security". Polish laws prohibit torture or degrading treatment and set out punishment for police officers including demotion and removal from the police force.

==== History ====
A key factor influencing the levels of police brutality in Poland has been the move from a communist state to a democracy. Force was particularly used by the ZOMO squads, which were elite units of Citizens' Militia (MO) during the Polish People's Republic. As a result, the opposition branded ZOMO with the nickname "Communist Gestapo". It is argued that Poland's transition has resulted in a more transparent system, reducing levels of police brutality. Although police brutality exists within Poland cases are much more likely to be handled by the criminal justice system with a greater chance for resolution through the courts.

While there are still instances of police brutality, trust in the police has steadily increased in Poland from 62% to 75% between 2002 and 2008, demonstrating the improvement in trust between the police and the general public.

Although there is a more open police force within Poland, many organizations still have issues against police brutality. The 2013 United States Department of State report on Poland raised several concerns of police brutality; The report cited a case of police officers using violence to acquire a confession for armed robbery in 2012, though it also noted that these police officers were eventually indicted for police brutality.

In year 2020 Polish women started protesting against new restrictions in abortion law. In response Polish police started arresting, use of gas against protesters and even beating them on the streets. Government states that use of force was necessary, even though there was no reported example of aggression on the side of protesters.

==== Issues with sports fans ====
In recent years one of the main sources of controversy concerning Polish police brutality has been the use of rubber bullets to disperse uncooperative crowds at sporting events.

In 1998, major riots occurred when a young basketball fan was killed by the police. In 2004, a man was killed and a woman injured in a riot when Polish police accidentally shot live ammunition instead of rubber bullets into the crowd after an association football game. Another set of riots occurred in 2015 in response to a pitch invasion during a football match. Although rubber bullets were used, one man was hit in the neck and later died at the hospital. A former police officer justified the use of weapons as a means to combat football hooliganism. Protesters have characterized the detainment of sports fans protesting against the government as unfair and undemocratic.

==== Issues with Roma ====
The Polish police also have a history of police brutality within the Roma community. There are multiple cases of police beatings and other discriminatory acts against the Roma by the police. The European Roma Rights Centre argues that investigations into police brutality cases are seldom carried out and that the police brutality against the Roma minority is systematic.

One particular case of police brutality against the Romani people occurred in 1998 when the police took four Roma men to a field and beat them. The men that were beaten were hospitalised for broken bones and other injuries; they were charged with vulgar words and behavior in public.

=== Portugal ===
Portugal is ranked the fourth most heavily policed country in the world. The police force is divided into five main organisations, with the Polícia de Segurança Pública (PSP) having the most prominent urban presence. The PSP has a diverse range of duties and responsibilities, which include protecting the rights of citizens and ensuring democratic legality.

The use of weapons by Portuguese police is permitted only when:

[...] absolutely necessary and when less dangerous means have proved ineffective, and provided that their use is proportionate to the circumstances.

— Decreto-Lei No. 457/99 Art. 2(1),

This is restrictive on multiple counts; for example, police are not permitted to use their firearms when an offender is running away.

==== Football hooliganism ====
Portuguese police have adopted an aggressive position in combating football hooliganism. Despite their means being considered disproportionate, the police view the heavy-handed nature of their tactics as a necessary and successful approach towards protecting the community and maintaining social order.

In 2015, a viral video showed a Benfica fan being heavily beaten in front of his two children outside a football stadium. The footage, filmed by a local television station, showed Jose Magalhaes leaving the football match early with his children and elderly father before being confronted by police officers. Although the family appeared calm, Magalhaes was tackled to the ground by police and repeatedly hit with a metal baton, while his father was punched in the face twice. More police rushed to the scene to shield the children aged nine and thirteen.

A statement released by the PSP acknowledged the controversial incident and announced that an investigation was launched against the officer responsible for initiating the attack. The officer was later suspended for 90 days by the Ministry of Internal Affairs.

The statement also defended policing the large crowds in the aftermath of the football match. Riot police had clashed with supporters the following day in Lisbon as fans celebrated Benfica's title victory. The harsh approach was described as sufficient, justified, and necessary to prevent the social disorder from escalating.

In a similar incident in 2016, another football club, Sporting Lisbon, complained about "barbaric" police assaults on their fans.

==== Racism ====
There have been suggestions of institutionalised racism within the Portuguese police force, with activists claiming that discrimination is the deep-rooted cause of police brutality in Portugal. In its 2015/2016 annual report on Portugal, Amnesty International condemned the excessive force used by police against migrant and minority communities.

Despite a good record in migrant integration, historical parallels can be drawn between Portugal's colonial past and modern police racism. According to activists, police have killed 14 young black men since 2001; however, no police officer has been held responsible for the deaths.

Racially-influenced police actions are illustrated by the violence in Cova de Moura, a low socio-economic area housing a significant migrant population. Notably, during an incident in February 2015, a young man named Bruno Lopes was aggressively searched and physically abused. When bystanders protested the excessive force, police responded by firing shotguns loaded with rubber bullets at the witnesses.

On the same day, two human rights workers and five youth entered the Alfragide police station requesting information on Lopes' situation. Upon arrival, the group was allegedly attacked by police officers shouting racist slurs. The policemen dragged and kept the young men in the police station, where they detained, mistreated, and mocked them for two days.

17 police officers from the Alfragide police station were eventually sent to trial on a variety of charges, including physical aggression, torture, document forging, and aggravated kidnapping. {{Update}} As of October 2018, the trial is ongoing, with victims being heard in court.

The European Commission against Racism and Intolerance (ECRI) has raised concerns about police mistreatment of minorities in Portugal in all of its reports on the country. In its fifth country report of 2018, ECRI mentions the Alfragide case in connection to the failure of IGAI (Inspeção-Geral da Administração Interna) or officers higher up in the chain of command to stop the abuses. IGAI is currently the body responsible for scrutinizing police activities in the country, but it is part of the Ministry of the Interior like the police forces. In its 2018 report, ECRI recommended that such work should be carried out by the country's Ombudsman, an equality body, or by a new and (entirely) independent body that can be created for that purpose.

Portuguese people of Roma descent have also been victims of police harassment and brutality in the country. There are several examples publicized by the media: one case from 2007 involved a Roma man and his son. The two walked to the Nelas police station in Porto to get some information, but the police allegedly ended up abusing them. Two officers were convicted in 2011 for physically assaulting the father.

An example of police brutality that occurred in 2012 is the night raid of a Roma campsite by the GNR (Guarda Nacional Republicana), in Cabanelas, Vila Verde. Some of the people living in the camp, including children and women, were reportedly attacked by GNR officers. Six Roma that were detained in the operation allege that they were later tortured and humiliated in the GNR station of Amares; the GNR denied the accusations, while SOS Racismo promised to file a complaint against the force. The last remnant of overt institutional racism, in Portugal, is article 81 of GNR's regulation law, which provides for an increased policing of nomadic people, who in general are known to be mostly Roma; the regulation's constitutionality was unsuccessfully challenged in the 1980s.

=== Russia ===
Russian protests have gained media attention with the reelection of Vladimir Putin in 2012. More attention has been given to the frequency of police brutality shown on posted videos online. Then-president Dmitry Medvedev initiated reforms of the police force in an attempt to minimize the violence by firing the Moscow police chief and centralising police powers. Police divisions in Russia are often based on loyalty systems that favor bureaucratic power among political elites. Phone tapping and business raids are common practice in the country, and often fail to give due process to citizens. Proper investigations into police officials are still considered insufficient by Western standards.

In 2012, Russia's top investigative agency investigated charges that four police officers had tortured detainees under custody. Human rights activists claim that Russian police use torture techniques to extract false confessions from detainees. Police regulations require officers to meet quotas for solving crimes, which encourages false arrests to meet their numbers. In 2022, during the Russian invasion of Ukraine, Russian police were seen attacking protesters.

In the early days, when Russia was part of the Soviet Union, the secret police and authorities used to detain people and send certain people to the gulags.

=== Slovakia ===
Police brutality in Slovakia is systematic and widely documented, but is almost exclusively enacted on the Romani minority. The nation-state itself has particularly racist attitudes toward the Romani minority dating back to before the split of Czechoslovakia. It is widely known that the government practiced forced sterilisation of Romani women and the segregation of the Romani into walled-off settlements; these forms of discrimination have filtered down to the police force. Excessive use of force against the Romani minority by police has been publicly criticised by the United Nations. The police force has been repeatedly condemned by several organisations for lengthy pre-trial detention and its treatment of suspects in custody.

In 2001, a 51-year-old Romani man died as a result of abuse in police custody at the hands of the Mayor of Magnezitovce and his son who works as a police officer. The victim, Karol Sendrei, was allegedly chained to a radiator and fatally beaten after being forcefully removed from his home. While the mayor's son was immediately removed from the police force and the mayor was suspended from his position, the latter was reinstated four months later. In response to this incident, the Minister for Internal Affairs attempted to establish new measures to prevent police brutality by including mandatory psychological testing for law enforcement and better training around the effective use of coercion. However, police brutality toward the Roma minority remains a serious issue.

Video footage shot by law enforcement officers in 2009 shows 6 Romani boys aged between 6-16 being forced to strip naked, kiss, and slap each other. It is alleged that the boys were then set upon by police dogs, with at least two sustaining serious injuries. Officers attempted to justify their behaviour because the boys were suspected of theft against an elderly citizen; however, cruel, inhuman, or degrading treatment by police, regardless of whether a crime has been suspected or committed, is prohibited under international law. The 10 law enforcement officers involved have since been acquitted after the judge ruled the video inadmissible in court as it was obtained illegally. As the footage was the main piece of evidentiary support for the crime, without it a conviction could not be passed down.

Human rights watchdog organisations have raised concerns around police selectivity in making recordings of raids after a raid in the settlement of Vrbica in 2015; the police claimed to have not thought the settlement would be problematic; this raid involved 15 men being seriously injured.

It is often the experience of the Roma in regards to pressing charges for police brutality, a counter charge is often threatened by law enforcement in an attempt to pressure the alleged victim into dropping the charges. It is generally an effective move as the hostile attitude toward the Roma in Slovakia is so entrenched that lawyers are often reluctant to represent Romani victims.

=== Slovenia ===
Minority groups in Slovenia, particularly the Roma and any residents from the former Yugoslav Republic face discrimination and sometimes brutality by Slovenian police. The Roma are major targets because of their being stereotyped as an inherently criminal population. They often live in illegal settlements in very low socio-economic conditions, which contributes to their discrimination and their reputation as criminals. They are one of the ethnic minorities from former Yugoslavic states known as "the erased" who, after Slovenia declared of independence in 1991, lost all legal status, social, civil, and political rights. This made them particularly vulnerable to police brutality. Their rights have not been fully restored yet. Due to their lack of rights and legal status, it is difficult to hold police officers accountable for offences committed against the Romani.

The police have been known to occasionally use excessive force against detainees in prisons, as well as foreigners and other minority groups, though no police officer has ever been arrested or charged. It is argued that authorities turn a blind eye to any allegations that arise because the victims are often from ethnic minorities, and there is a culture of racism within parts of the police force. When investigations are made, they are often ineffective.

The worst case of police brutality was the November 2012 protests; political dissatisfaction spurred a series of protests in Maribor, Slovenia. For the most part, the protests were peaceful; the crowds chanted and behaved non-violently for about two hours on 26 November 2012 (also known as, "the second Maribor uprising"). However, the violence began when crowds moved towards an area with a heavy police presence. Police used excessive force to disperse the crowds, including tear gas, dragging and beating protesters, police dogs, and mounted police who indiscriminately charged into the crowd. Civilians, protesters, and journalists were all targeted. Authorities attempted to justify the use of force by claiming protesters were violent and the use of force was necessary and not excessive. Slovenian media sources reported that the protest only turned violent after the police started using physical force. This level of violence was unprecedented and entirely unexpected in Slovenia.

Since 2003, Slovenian authorities have attempted to rectify this discrimination by introducing a two-day training programme on policing in a multi-ethnic community. The programme involved teaching the police about Roma culture and their language which helped to break down some of the stereotypes that caused tension. The Roma were made aware of their rights, and the police were educated about national and international standards regarding the treatment of minorities. It also helped to build trust between the Roma community and the police. Tensions still exist between the two groups, especially concerning police who have not participated in this programme; however, they have been greatly reduced.

=== Spain ===
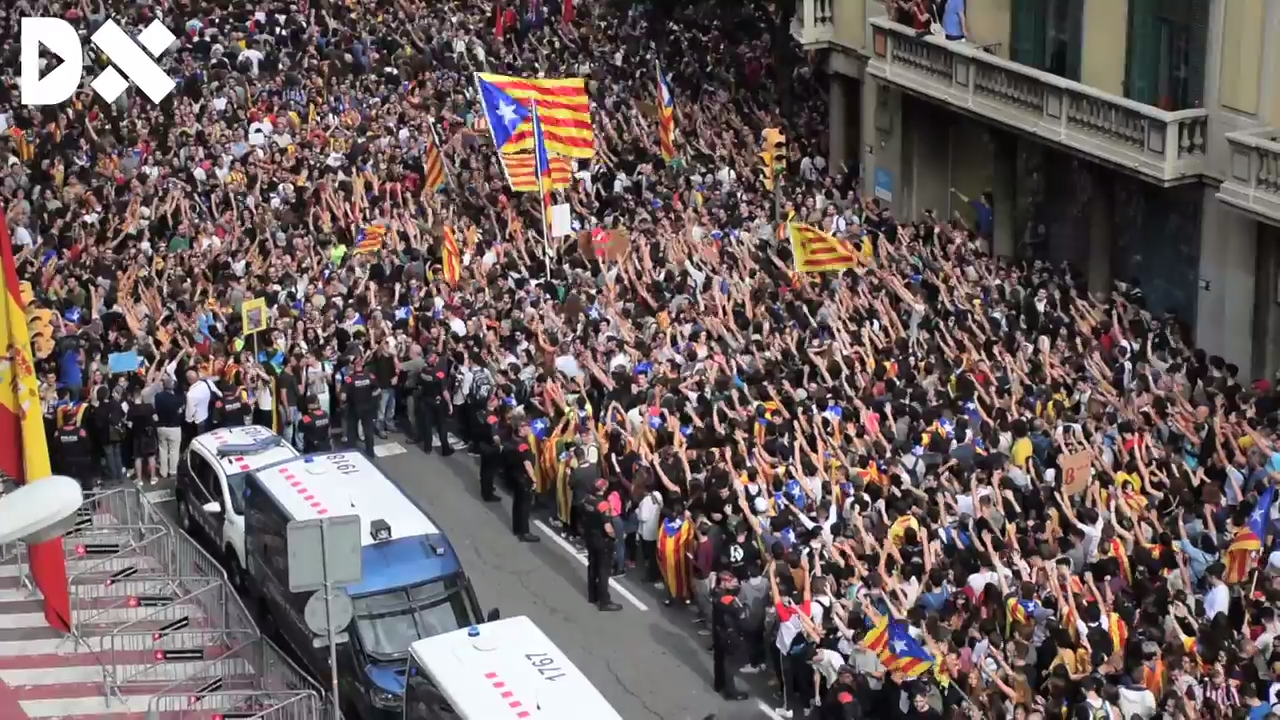
2017 Catalan general strike against police brutality

With the beginning and spread of several mass movements of protests in 1968, including various regions and cities of Spain united against Francisco Franco's regime, the Francoist dictatorship of Spain repressed the protests and strikes in the country using police brutality and state violence.

In post-Francoist Spain (1975–present), two notable demonstrations were the ones that occurred in Barcelona on 27 May 2011, and in Madrid on 25 September 2012. Video footage published online showed the use of force by police against peaceful demonstrators on both occasions. Images show officers using handheld batons to repeatedly hit peaceful demonstrators (some of them in the face and neck), rubber bullets, pepper spray, and the injuries caused.

Despite public outrage, the Spanish government did not make any attempt to reform policing and police mistreatment of the public; the opposite happened instead: in July 2016, new reforms to the law on Public Security and the Criminal Code were enforced which limited the right to freedom of assembly and gave police officers the broad discretion to fine people who show a "lack of respect" towards them. The Law on Public Security also includes an offence of spreading images of police officers in certain cases. The UN Human Rights Commission has expressed concern at the impact this legislation could have on human rights and police accountability. Fines for insulting a police officer can be up to €600 and as much as €30,000 for spreading damaging photos of police officers. Amnesty International identifies three main areas of concern about police action during demonstrations and assemblies: excessive use of force and inappropriate use of riot equipment, excessive use of force when arresting demonstrators, and poor treatment of detainees in police custody.

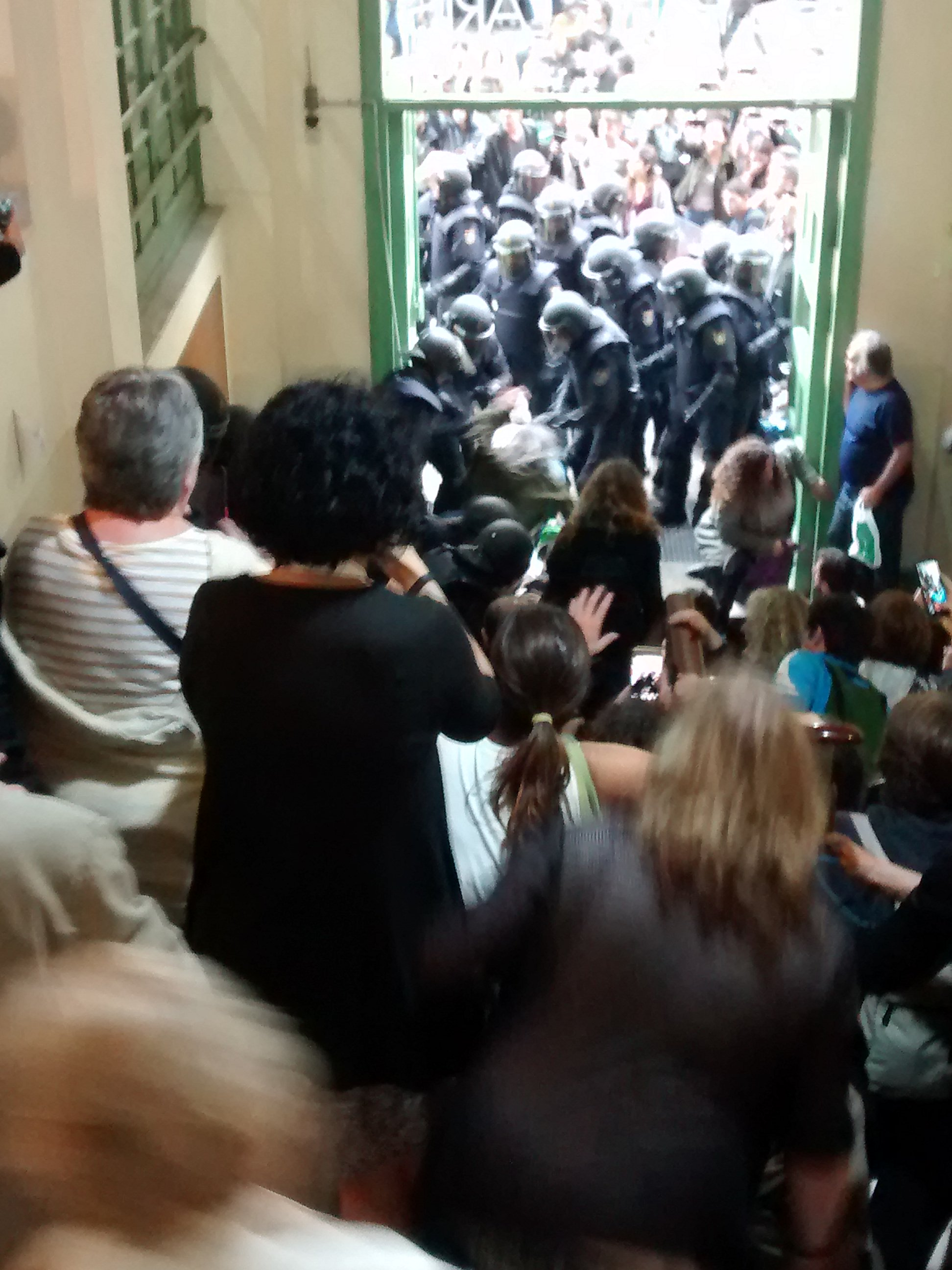
Spanish National Police storm polling station during the 2017 Catalan independence referendum.

Amnesty International and ACODI (Acción Contra la Discriminación) have both called out Spain for racial profiling and ethnic discrimination. ACODI documented 612 cases of racial discrimination in a single year, emphasising that many of these did not lead to official complaints because victims feared police retaliation or believed their complaints would be ignored. This belief is not unfounded; in 2005, Beauty Solomon, an African American immigrant working as a prostitute, filed two criminal complaints against Spanish policemen for repeated harassment and physical assault. Despite eyewitness testimony and medical reports confirming her injuries the Spanish Courts dismissed her claims on the grounds of insufficient evidence. Solomon then took her case to the European Court of Human Rights, who unanimously ruled in her favour that Spain had violated Article 3 (prohibition of inhuman and degrading treatment) and Article 14 (prohibition of discrimination) of the European Convention of Human Rights. They also condemned Spain for failing to investigate both Solomon's assault and other racist and sexist acts of violence by police officers.

Under Spanish law, the police have the right to check the identity of anyone in a public space when there is a security concern. However, African and Latin American immigrants are most frequently targeted, often without a legitimate security concern. "People who do not 'look Spanish' can be stopped by police as often as four times a day," said Izza Leghtas, an Amnesty International researcher.

=== Sweden ===
According to David Grobgeld of the Center for a Stateless Society, the REVA (Legally Certain and Efficient Enforcement) project, an attempt to deport illegal immigrants, exposed brutal and illegal methods used by police. According to Grobgeld officers have been shown to harass and racially profile non-white Swedes who often live in segregated suburbs. This has resulted in social disobedience with people in Sweden updating others on Twitter and Facebook on the whereabouts of police.

==== Examples ====
In 2013 police shot a man in his home in front of his wife in the town of Husby, a suburb of Stockholm. The police alleged the man had been wielding a machete and threatening them with it. The Stockholm riots were set off after the Husby shooting, where more than 100 cars were torched. When the police showed up they had stones thrown at them. People said the police called them "monkeys" and used batons against them in the clash.

In another incident in 2013, an African-born Swede was refused entry into a local club in Malmö for wearing traditional African clothes. The police picked him up and in the process of his arrest broke his arm and locked him in a cell for nearly six hours with no medical aid. Socially excluded groups have been targeted and the result of police investigations often means the police officers are not deemed to be at fault.

According to Grobgeld, the common denominator for people on a special police list is being or being married to a Romani person. A register of 4029 Romani people is kept by police. The police say the document is a register of criminals and their associates and is used to fight crime in Skåne County despite people being on it that have no connection with Skåne or any association with criminal people. According to Grobgeld, police target apparent ethnicity at Stockholm subways for ID-checks to see if they are illegal immigrants. The police claim that they are "following orders", the "rule of law" and "democratic process".

In February 2016, a nine-year-old was accused of not paying for a railway ticket in Malmö. The police ordered the local security guards to stop the child. One guard tackled him to the ground and sat on him. He then pushed the child's face into the pavement hard and covered his mouth. The child can be heard screaming and gasping on the video that has gone viral on the internet. The police then put him in handcuffs.

In August 2018, the Swedish police fired 25 shots and killed a man named Eric Torell who had Down Syndrome and was holding a toy gun.

=== Switzerland ===
- 1999, Zurich: Khaled Abuzarifa died of suffocation after being bound and gagged by his police escort at the Zurich airport.
- November 2016, Bex: Hervé Mandundu was shot several times and killed by police, who claim he tried to attack him with a knife. This account is disputed by his neighbors.
- October 2017, Lausanne: Lamin Fatty was mistaken for another person with the same name and detained. He was found dead in his jail cell the following day.
- February 2018, Lausanne: Mike Ben Peter was held to the ground by police for six minutes. He then collapsed and died of cardiac arrest twelve hours later. There were reports that he was repeatedly kicked by the police in his genital area, and an autopsy confirmed severe bruising in this region. The police officers involved were not suspended, but have been charged with negligent homicide in an ongoing case.
- May 2001, Valais: Samson Chukwu died of suffocation as a police officer put his weight on the back of a face-down Chukwu. Authorities originally claimed he died of a heart attack, but an autopsy later showed that postural asphyxiation led to Chukwu's death.
- 2001, Bern: Cemal Gomec was attacked by police officers with batons to the head, irritant gas, a shock grenade, rubber bullets. A sedative is said to have led to cardiac arrest which led to his death a few days later.

=== United Kingdom ===
In 2015 the United Kingdom employed approximately 126,818 police officers in the 43 police forces of England, Wales and the British Transport Police, the lowest number since March 2002.

==== Legislation and treaties ====
The 1967 Criminal Law Act, the 2008 Common Law and the Criminal Justice and Immigration Act, the 1984 Police and Criminal Evidence Act, and the European Convention on Human Rights (ECHR) set out the law and acceptable use of force in the UK. The use of unnecessary physical force is in principle an infringement of ECHR Article 3. The use of force should be "reasonable" in the circumstances. Physical force is considered appropriate if:

- it is absolutely necessary for a purpose permitted by law, and
- the amount of force used is reasonable and proportionate

This requires a consideration of the degree of force used. Any excessive use of force by a police officer is unlawful and an officer could be prosecuted under criminal law.

==== Findings and statistics ====
Since 2004/05, the Independent Police Complaints Commission (IPCC) published complaint statistics reports for England and Wales. In the 2014/15 annual report, the IPCC reported that there were 17 deaths in or following police custody and only one fatal police shooting from 2014 to 2017. These figures more than doubled when the IPCC was first erected. The annual report for 2015/16 was published on 26 July 2016. A total of 37,105 complaints were recorded in 2014/15, marking a 6% increase to the previous year, and a 62% overall increase since 2004/05. Allegations of "neglect or failure in duty" accounted for 34% of all allegations recorded while "other assault" and "oppressive conduct" or harassment made up only 8% and 6% respectively.

==== Public dissatisfaction and discrimination ====
Despite an average reduction in deaths in custody since 2004, a 2014 Public Confidence Survey revealed that public satisfaction following contact with the police was falling and that there was a greater willingness to file a complaint. The Metropolitan Police, who operate in some of the most ethnically diverse parts of the UK, received the greatest number of complaints in 2014/15 at 6,828 claims. However, young people and people from black or minority ethnic groups were much less likely to come forward with complaints.

While instances of police brutality in the UK is comparatively less than its US counterpart, there are nonetheless high profile incidents that have received wide media coverage.

==== Examples ====
In May 2013, 21-year-old Julian Cole was arrested outside a nightclub in Bedford by six police officers. The altercation left Cole in a vegetative state due to a severed spinal cord. Expert evidence indicated that Cole was struck with considerable force on his neck whilst his head was pulled back. Despite calls by the IPCC to suspend the officers, Bedfordshire chief constable Colette Paul refused to place the six police officers on restricted duties despite being under criminal investigation. The Bedfordshire police denied allegations that the use of excessive force on Cole was race-related.

On 20 February 2014, Bedfordshire Police Constables Christopher Thomas and Christopher Pitts, chased Faruk Ali before allegedly knocking him over and punching him in the face outside his family home. Ali was described as an autistic man who had the mental age of a five-year-old. The police officers, who were accused of laughing throughout the ordeal, were cleared of misconduct in public office by the Aylesbury Crown Court. Following an investigation by the IPCC, the officers were fired following breaches of standards of professional conduct including standards of honesty, integrity, authority, equality, and diversity.

On 13 July 2016, 18-year-old Mzee Mohammed died in police custody after being detained by Merseyside police at a Liverpool shopping centre. Officers were called to the scene after Mzee was allegedly behaving aggressively and erratically while armed with a knife. After successfully detaining Mzee, the police called an ambulance after Mzee suffered a "medical episode" and was pronounced dead. Video evidence surfaced showing Mohammed surrounded by officers and paramedics, seemingly fully unconscious while being placed face down with his hands handcuffed behind his back. Questions remain about how appropriate medical condition could have been administered given how the handcuffs would restrict breathing. Mohammed is the 21st black person to die in police custody in six years.

== North America ==
=== Belize ===
The use of excessive or unwarranted force by law enforcement in Belize is thought to be on the rise, following a yet unmitigated boom in violent and organised crime since the late 1990s. A 2019 study by Hannes Warnecke-Berger of the University of Leipzig noted 'police brutality seems to have become an everyday practice [which includes] the beating of children in the streets, torture of suspects in custody as well as police killings.' Similarly, a 2021 poll by the World Justice Project found that only 47 percent of respondents in Belize believed police do not use excessive force, with only 35 percent believing police were investigated for misconduct.

=== Canada ===
There have been several high-profile cases of alleged police brutality, including the 2010 G20 Toronto summit protests, the 2012 Quebec student protests, the Robert Dziekański Taser incident, and the shooting of Sammy Yatim. The public incidents in which police judgments or actions have been called into question raised concerns about police accountability and governance.

=== United States ===
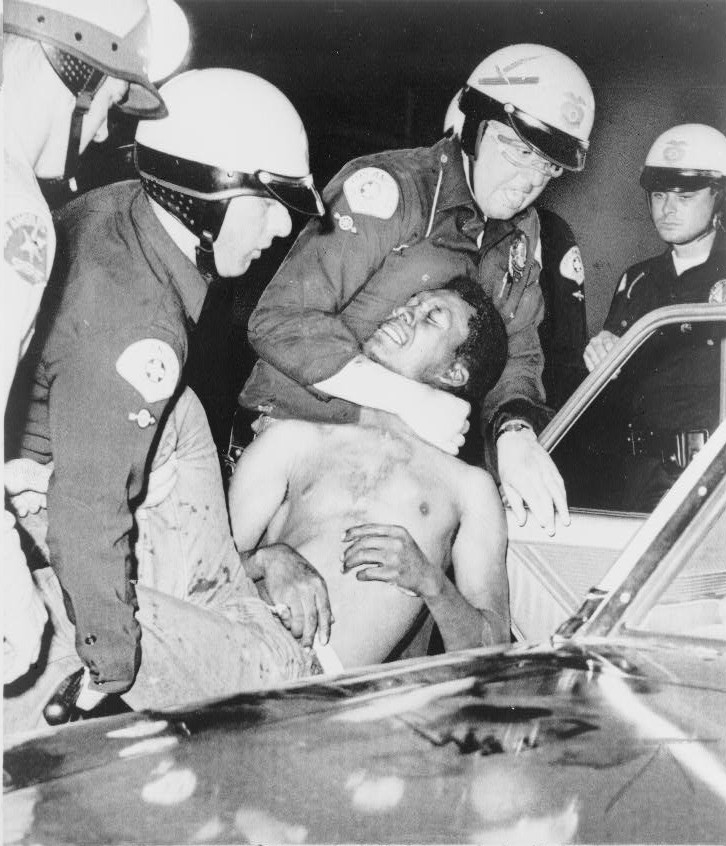
LAPD officers restrain a man during the Watts Riots, August 1965.

In the United States, major political and social movements have involved excessive force by police, including the civil rights movement of the 1960s, anti-war demonstrations, the war on drugs, and the global war on terrorism. In 2014, the UN Committee against Torture condemned police brutality and excessive use of force by law enforcement in the US, and highlighted the "frequent and recurrent police shootings or fatal pursuits of unarmed black individuals". The United Nations' Working Group of Experts on People of African Descent's 2016 report noted that "contemporary police killings and the trauma that they create are reminiscent of the past racial terror of lynching."

Seven members of the United States Maryland military police were convicted for the Abu Ghraib torture and prisoner abuse incidents in Iraq. Detainees were abused within the prison by being forced to jump on their naked feet, being videotaped in sexually exploitative positions, having chains around their neck for photos, and being kept naked for days.

The United States has developed a notorious reputation for cases of police brutality. The United States has a far higher number of police killings compared to other Western countries. U.S. police killed 1,093 people in 2016 and 1,146 people in 2015, and at least 1,176 people in 2022, the deadliest year on record. Mass shootings have killed 339 people since 2015, whereas police shootings over the same time span claimed the lives of 4,355 people. An FBI homicide report from 2012 observed that while black people represent 13% of the US population, they amounted to 31% of those killed by police, and were responsible for 48% of police murdered. It was found through Kaiser Family Foundation research that almost half of Black Americans believe they have been victimized by law enforcement. The FBI 2019 Law Enforcement Officers Killed and Assaulted report, Table 42 reports that black persons were responsible for 37% of all officers killed from 2012 through 2019.

According to a 2021 study published in The Lancet, more than 30,000 people were killed by police in the United States between 1980 and 2018. Around 2,500 of those killed by police from 2015 to 2022 were fleeing.

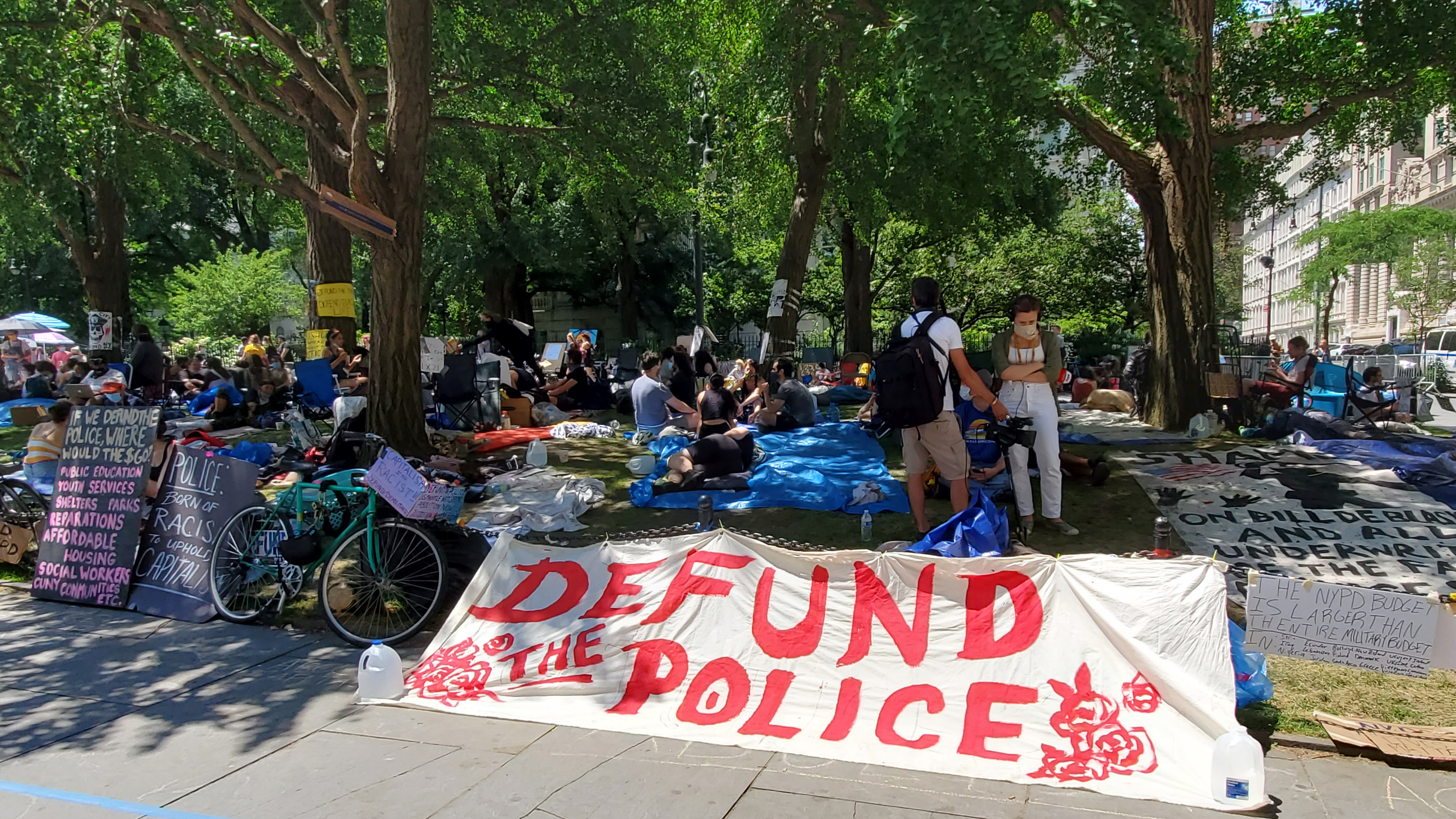
In June 2020, the "defund the police" slogan gained widespread popularity during the George Floyd protests.

==== Examples ====
Breonna Taylor was killed at the age of 26 when police forced entry into the apartment as part of an investigation into drug dealing operations. Officers said that they announced themselves as police before forcing entry, but Walker said he did not hear any announcement, thought the officers were intruders, and fired a warning shot at them and hit Mattingly in the leg, and the officers fired 32 shots in return. Walker was unhurt but Taylor was hit by six bullets and died. On 23 September, a state grand jury found the shooting of Taylor justified but indicted officer Hankison on three counts of wanton endangerment for endangering Taylor's neighbors with his shots.

On 25 May 2020, George Floyd, an unarmed African American man, was killed by a Minneapolis police officer, Derek Chauvin, who knelt on his neck for over nine minutes (9:29 seconds) while three other officers appeared to restrain his back and legs. In the video, it appears George Floyd screaming "You are going to kill me man!" Chauvin was charged with 2nd-degree murder; his three colleagues stand accused of aiding and abetting. The colleagues of Derek Chauvin include Alexander Kueng, Thomas Lane, and Tou Thao. Floyd's murder, captured on video, triggered protests against racial discrimination across the US and the world. In June 2021, former officer Chauvin was found guilty of three counts of murder and manslaughter and received a sentence of 22.5 years in prison.

== South America ==
=== Argentina ===
This is a list of notable cases of police brutality in Argentina.

- 1903–1904: during a long campaign of general strikes organized by the Argentine Regional Workers' Federation, a May Day 1903 clash between workers and police left two dead and 15 injured. At a bakers' strike in Rosario, one worker was shot by police.
- 1909: on May Day, a large workers march through Buenos Aires was broken up by the police, resulting in 12 deaths and a hundred wounded.
- 1919: a series of riots and massacres took place in Buenos Aires in January, when anarchist unions declared a massive strike remembered as Tragic Week.
- 1921: several policemen were killed in the first phase of the Patagonia rebelde, an anarchist strike which was put down by the Army in a bloodless action in May, but in the second phase, starting in November, army forces executed hundreds of rural workers. Local police and the National Gendarmerie assisted the army in the massacre.
- 1932: Federal Police chief Leopoldo Polo Lugones introduced the picana, a torture device adapted from the electric cattle prod, in Buenos Aires.
- 1966: During a protest led by professors and students of the University of Buenos Aires, five university departments were brutally cleared by the Federal Police, in a repressive action known as La Noche de los Bastones Largos ("The Night of the Long Batons").
- 1966: student Santiago Pampillón was shot dead by police during a protest in downtown Córdoba in September.
- 1969: the police killed two students during the riots known as the first Rosariazo, which took place at Rosario in May. The police were overwhelmed during the second Rosariazo in September, and the army moved in, suppressing the protest.
- 1969: shortly after the first Rosariazo there was a general strike in Córdoba, which provoked the police repression and led to a civil uprising later termed the Cordobazo.
- 1991: Walter Bulacio was killed by the federal police's beating after a razzia when he was taken to the police sectional.
- 2001: during the December 2001 riots, there were violent incidents between police and protesters throughout the country, mostly in Buenos Aires and in Santa Fe Province. Five people were killed at Plaza de Mayo.
- 2002: Maximiliano Kosteki (21) and Darío Santillán (22) were killed by Buenos Aires Provincial Police in the context of a mass mobilization repressed by state forces.
- 2009: teenager Luciano Arruga went missing after being intercepted by police. The case has been presented by human rights organisations as an emblematic example of post-dictatorship enforced disappearance.
- 2017: On 8 December, officer Luis Chocobar shot two young criminals escaping from an attempted robbery and stabbing. Chocobar killed 18-year-old Juan Pablo Kukoc and injured the other young man. In May 2021, Chocobar received a 2-year suspended sentence, which was annulled in May 2024, with the Court of Cassation ordering a new trial.
- 2020: Luis Espinoza disappeared and was later found dead. He was killed by Tucumán Provincial Police in the context of the 2020 lockdowns due to the COVID-19 pandemic. He was covered in plastic and rug, his body moved to a police precinct, and then taken in a car trunk to the neighboring province of Catamarca where his body was dropped into a ravine.

=== Brazil ===
The police in Brazil have a history of violence against the lower classes. It dates back to the nineteenth century when it primarily served as an instrument to control slaves. In a mostly rural country, the police forces were heavily influenced by local large landowners known as "colonels".

In the latter half of the twentieth century, the country was heavily urbanized, while over its last military dictatorship state governments became responsible for Brazilian police forces experiencing which became heavily militarized.

The militarist approach to dealing with social issues led the country to its highest violence levels and in 2015 Brazil had more violent deaths than the Syrian Civil War, with most people fearing the police. More than 6,160 people were killed by the Brazilian police in 2018. In 2019, the state of Rio de Janeiro alone registered 1,814 killings by members of the police force in 2019, setting a new record. A significant portion of the officers involved had already been charged for crimes previously.

Research released by the Forum Brasileiro de Segurança Pública (Brazilian Public Security Forum) in partnership with São Paulo University showed that the Brazilian police killed approximately 6,416 people in 2020. Black and Brown people are 78% of the dead - 5,000 people, most of them men, poor, and aged 14 to 30 years old. It is what Brazilian Black Movement name the genocide of Black Brazilian youth. Rio de Janeiro is the city with the highest rates. According to Rio's Public Security Institute (ISP), in 2019, where 1,814 people were killed in legal police interventions, 1,423 were Black or Brown. The COVID-19 pandemic did not stop or diminish the killings, which increased 27,9% compared to 2019. An ISP report states that Rio's police killed 741 people from January to May – the highest rate in 22 years.

The ISP research reveals the disparities between the number of COVID-19 mitigating actions (36) and police encounters (120) in the first months of the pandemic. Due to this absence of public health politics and the increase of lethal operations in favelas, 17 organizations from the Black movement, human rights, and favelas organizations joined a political party towards entered a petition called ADPF (Arguição de Descumprimento de Preceito Fundamental) 635, known as "ADPF das Favelas" (Favela's ADPF) in Brazil's Supreme Court (Supremo Tribunal Federal – STF) demanding actions towards minimizing police terror in the communities. In May 2020, they asked for the immediate suspension of police operations during the pandemic, indicating that continuing such operations would threaten life and dignity. In addition, they cited mortality rates, power abuse cases, and the propriety damages caused by the police raids during a deadly pandemic in poor neighborhoods.

On May 18, 2020, João Pedro Pinto, a 14 years old boy, was killed inside his family's house. According to a witness, he lived in a place with a pool and a barbecue area, where he was with his cousins and friends when the police raid started. According to the survivors, the boys went to the covered area when they noticed that the police helicopter started to shoot. Moments later, the police invaded the place, which the boys informed: “There are only children here.” The police response was throwing two grenades that made the boys run into the house to protect themselves. João Pedro was shot in his belly by a rifle, his body was transported to a place 27 miles away from the crime scene, and the family had access to him after 17 hours. According to the reports and TV news, it was possible to count more than 70 bullet marks inside João Pedro's house. This murder led people to protest in the streets and was the main argument for the ADPF 635 petition, supported by Supreme Courts Minister Edson Fachin in August of the same year.

Afterward, the Court unanimously voted to maintain the decision, which would only authorize operations in "absolutely exceptional" cases that needed to be justified for the Public Ministry of the State of Rio de Janeiro. The Supreme Court also stated that in case of authorized operations in the pandemic, "Exceptional care should be taken, duly identified in writing by the competent authority, so as not to put in risk population' provision of public health services and the humanitarian aid activities." Even after the pandemic, it has prohibited using helicopters as a platform for shooting and terror, conducting operations near schools and hospitals, and using them as police operational bases. The crime scene must be preserved and must avoid body remotion (by the excuse of supposed rescue). The technical-scientific police must document evidence, reports, and autopsy exams to ensure the possibility of independent review; Investigations must meet the Minnesota Protocol requirements. It must be fast, effective, and complete well as independent, impartial, and transparent.

The decision was celebrated by the group as a mark in the history of justice and lives in favela's struggle. The organizations that joined the political party (PSB – Socialist Brazilian Party) were Rio de Janeiro Public Defense, Fala Akari, Papo Reto Collective, Rede de Comunidades e Movimentos Contra a Violência, Mães de Manguinhos, Redes da Maré, Movimento Negro Unificado, Educafro, Iniciativa Direito à Memória e Justiça Racial, ISER, Justiça Global, Conectas e National Human Rights Council. Other organizations as Observatório de Favelas, Maré Vive, Instituto Marielle Franco, Cesec, Grupo de Estudo dos Novos Legalismos/UFF e Fogo Cruzado contributed to the lawsuit.

In August 2020, the research group named “Grupo de Estudos dos Novos Ilegalismos” (GENI) from Federal Fluminense University in Rio de Janeiro with other civil organizations, stated that after the suspension of police operations by the STF, the mortality rates decreased to 72.5%. Furthermore, the criminality rates also decreased: a reduction of 47.7% in crimes against life, 37.9% in willful murder homicides, 39% in reduction in crimes against patrimonies, and less 32,1% in vehicle robbery. Nevertheless, the STF decision was not very well received by Rio de Janeiro's police, who complained and accused the decision to make their work more difficult, even with the decrease of criminality. They also did not always obey the order and did raid without the requirements the law demanded. According to the organization Rede de Observatórios, in the first two months of the year, police killed 47 people, 20% more than the same period of 2020.

On May 6, 2021, Rio de Janeiro police killed 28 people in Jacarezinho Favela in a raid that was considered a success by police forces and the state of Rio's government. Immediately after the slaughter, human rights activists denounced illegal actions as alteration of the crime scene, invasion of houses, in addition to non-compliance with the protocol demanded by the STF. It is considered the biggest slaughter in the history of the city and is still under investigation. One month later, on June 8, a young pregnant Black woman was killed by the police in another favela. Kathlen Romeu, 24 years old, four months pregnant, was walking with her grandmother when a police officer shot her. According to the Brazilian Bar Association's Humans Rights Commission (OAB), the operation that killed Kathlen was illegal, and the police officer was hiding in a neighbor's house to ambush criminals. According to the ISP and GENI Group, from January to September 2021, Rio de Janeiro police killed 811 people during their raids.

=== Colombia ===
Protests against police brutality started in Bogotá, the country's capital, following the death of Javier Ordóñez while in police custody on 9 September 2020. The unrest has since spread to many cities throughout Colombia. As of 12 September 2020, 13 people have died and over 400 have been injured as part of the protests.

=== Chile ===
In recent years, Chile's police force Carabineros de Chile has been under investigation because of various cases of power abuse and police brutality, particularly towards students participating in riots for better education and the indigenous Mapuche people; countless cases of violence were enacted on this group for allegedly committing crimes; it was later discovered that some Carabineros officers were responsible for these crimes and blamed Mapuches.

One of the recent cases involving the Mapuche was Camilo Catrillanca's death. The first reports of his death came from the Carabineros who claimed that Camilo shot at a police officer and others while being investigated for allegedly stealing three cars. The Carabineros special forces team Comando Jungla was in the Araucanía Region searching for terrorists. After seeing Camilo "attacking" policemen with a gun in an attempt to escape, the Carabineros shot Camilo in the head and killed him. It was later discovered that this was not what happened; a partner of the police officer that killed Camilo showed the video of the policeman killing him while he drove a tractor. Carabineros was asked why they did not have a recording of the officer being shot at by Camilo. The institution responded the officer destroyed the SD card because it had private photos and videos of his wife; most people were not satisfied with the answer. The policeman was later discharged and prosecuted.

During the 2019–20 Chilean protests, Carabineros de Chile has caused hundreds of eye mutilations on protesters and random civilians with hardened rubber bullets and tear gas canisters. The most notorious cases are of the victims with complete loss of vision Gustavo Gatica and Fabiola Campillai.

=== Venezuela ===
During the 2014 Venezuelan protests, multiple human rights organizations condemned the Venezuelan government for its handling of the protests as security forces had reportedly gone beyond typical practices of handling protests, with methods ranging from the use of rubber pellets and tear gas to instances of live ammunition and torture of arrested protesters, according to organizations like Amnesty International and Human Rights Watch. Hundreds of Venezuelans were tortured when detained by Venezuelan authorities.

During the 2017 Venezuelan protests, the United Nations Human Rights Office denounced "widespread and systematic use of excessive force" against demonstrators, saying security forces and pro-government groups were responsible for the deaths of at least 73 protesters. The UN Human Rights Office described "a picture of widespread and systematic use of excessive force and arbitrary detentions against demonstrators in Venezuela". "Witness accounts suggest that security forces, mainly the national guard, the national police and local police forces, have systematically used disproportionate force to instil fear, crush dissent and to prevent demonstrators from assembling, rallying and reaching public institutions to present petitions".

External videos
- National Guardsman firing live ammunition at protesters on 19 June, killing Fabián Urbina on YouTube

Venezuelan protester David Vallenilla being shot dead by a security agent

The majority of individuals killed during protests died from gunshot wounds, with many resulting from the repression by Venezuelan authorities and assisting pro-government colectivos. A report by Human Rights Watch and Foro Penal documented at least six cases in which Venezuelan security forces raided residential areas and apartment buildings in Caracas and in four different states, usually near barricades built by residents; according to testimonies, officials bursted into houses without warrants, stealing personal belongings and food from residents, as well as beating and arresting them.

A report of the Office of the United Nations High Commissioner for Human Rights specified that non-lethal weapons were used systematically to cause unnecessary injuries, explaining that security forces had fired tear gas canisters directly against protesters at short distances. Mónica Kräuter, a chemist and teacher of the Simón Bolívar University who has studied over a thousand tear gas canisters since 2014, has stated that security forces have fired expired tear gas which, according to her, "breaks down into cyanide oxide, phosgenes and nitrogens that are extremely dangerous". Groups such as the Venezuelan Observatory of Health have denounced the use of tear gas fired directly or nearby health centers and hospitals, as well as houses and residential buildings.

In a 15 June statement, Human Rights Watch stated that high levels officials of the government, such as José Antonio Benavides Torres, the head of the Bolivarian National Guard; Vladimir Padrino López, the defense minister and the strategic operational commander of the Armed Forces; Néstor Reverol, the interior minister, Carlos Alfredo Pérez Ampueda, director of the Bolivarian National Police; Gustavo González López, the national intelligence director, and Siria Venero de Guerrero, the military attorney general, were responsible for the human rights violations and abuses performed by Venezuelan security forces during the protests. Venezuelan officials have praised authorities for their actions and denied any wrongdoing.

External videos
- Human Rights Watch multimedia report on abuses on YouTube

Human rights groups have stated that Venezuelan authorities have used force to gain confessions. Amnesty International maintains that the government has a "premeditated policy" to commit violent and lethal acts against protesters, stating that there is "a planned strategy by the government of President Maduro to use violence and illegitimate force against the Venezuelan population to neutralize any criticism". The Wall Street Journal reported that a young men had already been tortured at an army base when soldiers piled them into two jeeps and transported them to a wooded area just outside the Venezuelan capital. Foro Penal stated that "most of the detainees are beaten once they are arrested, while they are being transferred to a temporary detention site where they are to be brought before a judge", giving one instance with "a group of 40 people arrested for alleged looting, 37 reported that they were beaten before their hair was forcefully shaved off their heads". In other examples of abuses, "15 reported that they were forced to eat pasta with grass and excrement. The regime's officials forced dust from tear gas canisters up their noses to pry open their mouths. They then shoved the pasta with excrement in their mouths and made them swallow it".

== See also ==
- List of cases of police brutality by date
- List of countries with annual rates and counts for killings by law enforcement officers
- List of miscarriage of justice cases
- Lists of killings by law enforcement officers
