= 2020 Colombian protests =

2020 Colombian protests may refer to:

- 2019–2020 Colombian protests.
- Javier Ordóñez protests.
