= Killing of Nathaniel Julies =

2020 police killing in South Africa

- Date: August 26, 2020; 6 years ago
- Location: Eldorado Park, Johannesburg, Gauteng, South Africa; 26.292426°S 27.89789°E,
- Type: Shooting
- Target: Robbery pursuit Gang violence (unclear)
- Arrests: 3

Nathaniel “Lockie” Julies, a 16 year-old boy with Down syndrome, was fatally shot allegedly by South African Police Service (SAPS) officers Sergeant Simon ‘Scorpion’ Ndyalvane and Constable Caylene Whiteboy on 26 August 2020. A third suspect, Detective Voster Netshiongolo, appeared before the Pretoria Magistrate’s Court. Julies was shot meters away from his home in the Eldorado Park area of Johannesburg, Gauteng.

The three officers were charged with murder and the trial began in October of 2022.

== Incident ==
It was initially reported by Gauteng premier David Makhura that Julies was killed in crossfire between SAPS personnel and gang members.

The Julies family have stated that he was at a local tuck shop buying biscuits when the shooting occurred. Officers allegedly involved in the shooting stated that Julies was shot after allegedly failing to respond to police questioning. Media reports stated that Julies died before reaching hospital.

=== Witness accounts ===
An unidentified family member told the media that after purchasing two packs of biscuits Julies joined other nearby children in front of the Hillbrow flats where police first approached him. His father stated that Julies was approached by SAPS officers who tried to question him. The officers were unable to understand Julies and they moved on to questioning another person nearby. After officers had finished questioning and searching the second person, nearby Sergeant Simon 'Scorpion' Ndyalvane got out of a vehicle and shot Julies at close range with a pump action shotgun. The force of the shot propelled Julies' body under a truck. Shortly after the shooting police dragged his body out from under the truck and removed him from the scene.

Eyewitnesses stated that there was no gang presence in the area.

== Aftermath ==
The shooting highlighted longstanding community grievances with the operation of the Eldorado Park police station. Violent protest action broke out, with two SAPS officers and one Municipal Police officer injured, amidst threats by the community to burn down the police station. A petition calling for the prosecution of those involved in the shooting was signed by over 120,000 people. Minister of Police Bheki Cele said that the actions of the officers implicated in Julies' death were "uncalled for".

A tweet from American musician Solange Knowles increased awareness of the incident outside of South Africa, mentioning Julies' death along with those of Oluwatoyin Salau and of Breonna Taylor in the United States. Eldorado Park community members criticised the far-left Economic Freedom Fighters party for trying to politicise the event and "disrespecting" the funeral procession.

At the time of Julies' death he was the second child to have been killed by police action in South Africa in August 2020. The investigative journalism organisation Viewfinder found that thirty-nine children died in SAPS custody or due to SAPS action between April 2012 and March 2018, and that very few officers were held accountable for the deaths.

== Charges ==
Ndyalvane, Whiteboy and Netshiongolo were charged with "premeditated murder, defeating the ends of justice and possession of illegal ammunition". The trial began in October of 2022.

== See also ==
- Killing of Eric Torell
