= Murder of Riccardo Rasman =

2006 murder in Trieste, Italy

- Location: Trieste, Italy
- Date: 27 October 2006; 8:43 PM – 9:04 PM (CET)
- Attack type: asphyxiation
- Deaths: 1
- Victim: Riccardo Rasman
- Perpetrators: Mauro Miraz, Maurizio Mis and Giuseppe De Biasi

On 27 October 2006, three police officers (Mauro Miraz, Maurizio Mis, and Giuseppe De Biasi) killed Riccardo Rasman, a 34-year-old mentally disabled man, in Trieste, Italy.

On 14 December 2011, after the judicial process, the Court of Cassation confirmed the sentence of 6 months in prison for negligent homicide against the officers. The Ministry of the Interior and the three officers were also sentenced to pay compensation of over one million euros to the victim's family. The case has often been compared to that of Federico Aldrovandi, due to the manner of death and the dynamics of the incident.

== Events ==
On 27 October 2006, shortly after 8 pm, Riccardo Rasman (born 5 August 1972) was in his apartment at Via Grego 38, a building owned by ATER of Trieste. According to the reconstruction of the agents and the contradictory testimonies of the neighbours, Rasman was listening to music at high volume and, after going out naked onto the balcony, threw two firecrackers into the internal courtyard of the building; one of them exploded a short distance from a girl, without causing her any injuries. Rasman suffered from paranoid schizophrenic syndrome due to episodes of bullying suffered during his military service. The day of his death, Rasman was probably in a state of happiness and psychophysical agitation due to the fact that the following day he would start a job as an environmental operator.

Following a report to 113, two patrol cars arrived on the scene, for a total of four officers. The first patrol car arrived at 8.21pm and at 8.34pm asked for a second patrol car as reinforcement and for the intervention of the fire brigade to break down the door of the apartment. Rasman, who in the meantime had dressed and lay down in bed with the light off, refused to open, perhaps intimidated by another fight with the police dating back to 1999, which was followed by a complaint against two officers by Rasman. When the fire brigade intervened, the police officers entered and found Rasman sitting on the bed: a heated fight ensued between the four officers and Rasman, who was finally immobilized by the group on the ground, handcuffed behind his back and tied to his ankles with wire.

After being immobilized, despite being handcuffed, they continued to hold him in a prone position for several minutes. Rasman began to breathe heavily and wheeze, until he became cyanotic and suffered respiratory arrest. When an emergency vehicle arrived, he was declared dead. Death occurred between 8:43 PM and 9:04 PM. When paramedics arrived, Rasman was found handcuffed with his hands behind his back, his ankles immobilized with wire, and he showed serious injuries and signs of being gagged. It was clarified that despite the man being immobilized, the officers exerted "excessive pressure on the trunk, either by climbing together or alternately on his back, or by pressing with their knees, which seriously reduced his breathing capacity", causing death by asphyxiation.

The wounds, the blood splatter on the walls and the signs of violence were related to the use of blunt objects, such as an axe handle found in the apartment and the same crowbar used by the firefighters to force the front door. His sister Giuliana declared:

"[Riccardo's body] was battered by blows on his face, they had broken his cheekbone. Then there was the sign of the gag, blood from his ears, nose, mouth, you can see it very well [...]. We entered that apartment only in March, it was a disaster: there was blood everywhere and a bloodstain towards the kitchen. Then from the photographs I realized that they moved his head towards the entrance so as to hide the bloodstain that was there. There was a fracture, his hair was all full of blood, there was also a fracture behind his neck. There was blood on the table, on the walls, on the sheets, behind the bed on the floor, there were bloodstained on the carpet under which we even found some pieces of flesh hidden"

== Investigation ==
An official investigation was opened, entrusted to the public prosecutor Pietro Montrone, who delegated the investigation to the same police officers involved in the fight. The investigation was closed in October 2007 with a request for archiving by the magistrate, who considered that the four police officers had acted in the fulfillment of a duty, despite having ascertained that Rasman's death had been caused by "postural asphyxia" following the actions of the officers. On 28 February 2008 , however, in the hearing that should have closed the investigation, the investigating judge did not accept the public prosecutor's request for archiving: the latter changed his initial orientation in light of the defensive investigations presented on the occasion of the opposition to archiving proposed by the Rasmans' lawyers, Giovanni Di Lullo and Fabio Anselmo, and in the face of evidence that the four officers were aware of the fact that Rasman was being treated at the Domio Mental Health Centre.

This last fact should have forced the four officers (Francesca Gatti, Mauro Miraz, Maurizio Mis and Giuseppe De Biasi) to be more cautious and to request the dispatch of a specialized operator. The legitimacy of breaking down the door of the private residence was also contested, since Rasman's behavior no longer posed any danger, as the man had stopped throwing firecrackers and was calm and in his own bed. Before the arrival of the police, Rasman allegedly wrote the following words in a note, later found in the kitchen: "Please, please, I beg you, don't hurt me, I haven't done anything wrong". The four police officers were then investigated and sent to trial for manslaughter.

== Trials ==
=== First degree ===
On 29 January 2009, three of the four officers (Mauro Miraz, Maurizio Mis and Giuseppe De Biasi) were sentenced, with an abbreviated trial and suspended sentence, to six months in prison, accused of negligent homicide, and to pay a provisional sum of 60,000 Euro. Officer Francesca Gatti was instead acquitted with a "dubitative formula": she had taken part in the raid but when Riccardo Rasman had been rendered helpless, handcuffed and held down on the floor with his feet tied with wire, she had remained a stranger to the action because she was in radio contact with the operations room of the Police Headquarters. For the civil party, compensation of 20,000 Euro was ordered for moral damages.

=== Second degree ===
On 30 June 2010, the Court of Appeal of Trieste confirmed in the second instance the six-month prison sentence for three of the police officers accused of Rasman's death. The acquittal of the fourth accused officer was also confirmed. Both the lawyers of the Rasman family and the defenders of the police officers announced that they would appeal to the Supreme Court.

=== Court of Cassation ===
On 14 December 2011, the Court of Cassation also confirmed the version of the sentence issued in the previous levels and made the conviction for manslaughter definitive against the three officers. In the reasons for the sentence of the Court of Cassation it is written: " [Rasman's death] was peacefully avoidable if the officers had interrupted the activity of violent restraint on the ground of Rasman, allowing him to breathe".

=== Civil courts ===
In April 2015, the court of Trieste ordered the Ministry of the Interior and the three agents already found responsible to pay one million two hundred thousand euros to Rasman's family. The family's lawyer appealed, considering the amount insufficient.

== Aftermath ==
On the occasion of the ruling of the Court of Cassation, the lawyers of the Rasman family formally requested an apology from the Ministry of the Interior and announced a civil action against the police officers and the ministry itself. The family also requested a new medical-legal assessment based on the photos that were taken of Riccardo's body, where signs appear that start from the corners of the mouth up to the ears. The doubt, for the Rasmans, is that the boy died not only because he was suffocated by the weight of the officers, but was also suffocated. A detail that did not emerge during the first criminal trial and that could be decisive in the civil compensation case.

The lawyers of the Rasman family also filed a claim for compensation of 2 million euros against the two firefighters who had helped the policemen to tie Rasman with wire, in order to immobilize him. At the beginning of April 2013, the Public Prosecutor's Office of Trieste requested the archiving of the case.

== Bibliography ==
- Adriano Chiarelli, Malapolizia, Newton Compton, ISBN 9788854135239
- Alessia Lai, Tommaso Della Longa, Quando lo Stato uccide, Castelvecchi, ISBN 9788876155277

== See also ==
- Caso Aldrovandi
- Death of Giuseppe Uva
- Killing of Eric Torell
