= Alexander Young (VC) =

Recipient of the Victoria Cross

Alexander Young VC
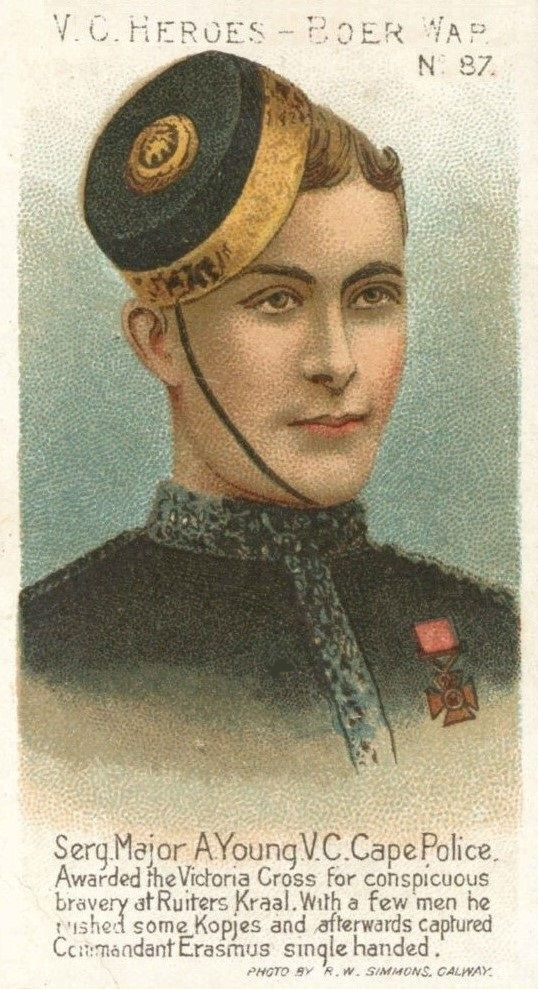
- Young on a cigarette card
- Born: 27 January 1873; Clarinbridge, County Galway, Ireland
- Died: 19 October 1916 (aged 43); France
- Burial place: Thiepval Memorial
- Military career
- Allegiance: United Kingdom; Cape Colony; South Africa
- Branch: British Army; South African Army
- Service years: 1890–1916
- Rank: Lieutenant
- Units: 2nd Dragoon Guards (Queen's Bays); Cape Police
- Conflicts: Reconquest of Sudan; Second Boer War; Bambatha Rebellion; First World War
- Awards: Victoria Cross

Alexander Young, VC (27 January 1873 – 19 October 1916) was an Irish-born South African soldier and a recipient of the Victoria Cross, the highest award for gallantry in the face of the enemy that can be awarded to British and Commonwealth forces.

A native of Oranmore, County Galway, Young joined the Queen's Bays on 22 May 1890 at Renmore. He served for a time in India, becoming a riding instructor. He took part in the reconquest of Sudan, and afterwards went to South Africa, joining the Cape Police as an instructor, with the rank of regimental sergeant major, serving in the Second Boer War.

== VC details ==
Young was 28 years old and a sergeant-major in the Cape Police, South African Forces during the Second Boer War when the following deed took place for which he was awarded the VC.

Towards the close of the action at Ruiter's Kraal on the 13th August, 1901, Sergeant-Major Young, with a handful of men, rushed some kopjes which were being held by Commandant Erasmus and about 20 Boers. On reaching these kopjes the enemy were seen galloping back to another kopje held by the Boers. Sergeant-Major Young then galloped on some 50 yards ahead of his party and closing with the enemy shot one of them and captured Commandant Erasmus, the latter firing at him three times at point blank range before being taken prisoner.

== Later service ==
Continuing with the Cape Police, from 1904 Young served on the border with German South West Africa during the Herero Wars, and in 1906 helped suppress the Bambatha Rebellion in Natal.

During the First World War, in 1915 he served with the Natal Light Horse in South West Africa, then in the North African Senussi campaign. Volunteering for service in France, he was commissioned in the South African Scottish Regiment with the rank of lieutenant. He was killed in action during the Battle of the Somme on 19 October 1916. His name appears on the Thiepval Memorial in France and St. Nicholas's church, Galway.

== The medal ==
Young's Victoria Cross is held in Lord Ashcroft's VC collection in the Imperial War Museum, London.
