= Killing of Eric Torell =

2018 police shooting in Stockholm, Sweden

- Part of Police brutality in Sweden
- Eric Torell
- Date: 2 August 2018
- Time: c. 4 a.m. CET
- Location: Norrbackagatan, Vasastan, Stockholm, Sweden
- Type: Homicide by gunshot
- Participants: Three members of the Swedish police force
- Deaths: Eric Torell
- Charges: Involuntary manslaughter and misconduct
- Verdict: Not guilty

The killing of Eric Torell was the fatal police shooting of a 20-year-old man with Down syndrome and autism spectrum disorder in the Vasastan district of Stockholm, Sweden, on 2 August 2018. Torell was carrying a toy gun when he was shot by police officers responding to reports of an armed man. The incident prompted widespread public debate in Sweden about police use of force.

== Background ==
Eric Torell was a 20-year-old man living in Stockholm who had Down syndrome and autism. According to his family, he had limited verbal communication abilities and functioned cognitively at the level of a young child.

== Shooting ==
On the night of 1–2 August 2018, Torell left his father's apartment carrying a plastic toy gun. Shortly afterward, police received emergency calls reporting a man in the area who was believed to be armed with a real firearm. In the early hours of 2 August 2018, three police officers encountered Torell in a residential courtyard in Vasastan. Officers later stated that they believed the object he was holding was a real gun and that he did not comply with shouted commands to stop. The officers opened fire, discharging a total of 25 shots. Torell was hit by several bullets, including shots to the back, and died at the scene from his injuries.

== Investigation ==
The shooting was investigated by Sweden's Special Prosecution Office for cases involving police officers. The investigation examined whether the use of lethal force was justified and whether police procedures had been followed correctly. In April 2019, three police officers were formally charged. One officer was charged with involuntary manslaughter, while the other two were charged with misconduct. Prosecutors argued that although officers may initially have believed Torell posed a threat, they should have stopped firing once he was no longer facing them.

== Trial ==
The trial began in September 2019 at the Stockholm District Court. All three officers pleaded not guilty, stating that they believed their lives were in danger and that the situation unfolded rapidly. On 3 October 2019, the Stockholm District Court acquitted all three officers of all charges. The court ruled that prosecutors had not proven beyond reasonable doubt that the officers' actions were criminal under the circumstances.

== Aftermath ==
Following the acquittal of the police officers, the case intensified public debate in Sweden about police readiness to use lethal force, particularly amid rising gang violence. Torell's family called for changes in police responses to emergencies involving people with developmental disabilities. Torell's mother said she accepted the verdict but urged reforms to better protect vulnerable individuals. The case also highlighted how rarely Swedish police are convicted for on-duty shootings.

== See also ==
- Killing of Nathaniel Julies
- Murder of Riccardo Rasman
