= Cape Peninsula Urban Police =

Police force in Cape Town (1652–1913)

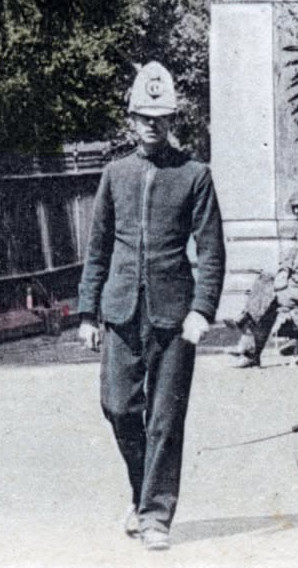
A photograph of a Cape Metro Police officer at the turn of the 20th century. Note the white colonial variant custodian helmet.

The Cape Peninsula Urban Police was an official civilian law enforcement body that provided policing in and around Cape Town from 1652 to 1913. It was run by the Dutch East India Company during the period of the Dutch Cape Colony and by the local colonial government for most of the period of the British Cape Colony. It was ultimately absorbed into the South African Police in 1914 following the formation of the Union of South Africa.

In 2001 the Cape Town Metropolitan Police Department was established as a distinct police force from the national police by an act of the Western Cape Provincial Parliament to support the operations of the national policy service and enforce municipal by-laws. Thereby re-establishing a local police force in the Cape peninsula region.

== 1652–1840 ==
=== Fiscal's law enforcement officers (1652–1840) ===
Formal law enforcement began shortly after the Dutch East India Company established its Table Bay outpost in April 1652. By December that year, there had been enough problems to warrant the appointment of a geweldiger to ensure order and the security of the Fort de Goede Hoop. Michiel Gleve was the first geweldiger.

From 1653, the geweldiger reported to the Fiscal, who was the outpost's chief law officer.

The outpost began to develop into a colony in 1657. As the population grew, the geweldiger's duties increased, and by the mid-1680s he was assisted by a gang of convict slaves, An additional geweldiger was later appointed, and a third in 1776.

In August 1780, after complaints about the geweldiger's convict slaves being sent to arrest Whites, the Van Plettenberg administration assigned a few White law enforcement officials, called geregtsdienaars to the Fiscal's staff.

From 1790, the Fiscal's men were headed by an onder-schout (later called 'under-sheriff'). Jan Hendrik Matthysen was the first appointee.

=== Night watch (1686–1840) ===
From July 1686, the burgher councillors (who were responsible for looking after the town) employed watchmen to patrol the streets at night, when the fiscal's men were off duty. This system was followed until 1840.

As the men were equipped with wooden rattles, to raise the alarm when necessary, they were known as the ratelwagt (rattle watch).

Regulations issued in 1714 defined their duties as watching out for fire, public mischief, housebreaking, theft or other offences, uproars in taverns, and unlocked doors and windows.

Under British rule, the ratelwagt became known as the 'night watch'. Control of the watch passed to the new Burgher Senate in 1796.

From 1817, the watchmen were divided into two groups, headed by commandants.

=== Burgher watch (1699–1795) ===
The ratelwagt were not the only ones patrolling the streets at night. From 1699, the burgher militia (citizen force) also patrolled the town. In this context, they were known as the 'burgher watch'.

The militia was controlled by the krygsraad (council of war), presided over by the commander of the garrison. The burgher watch system ended when the militia was disbanded in 1795.

=== Landdrost's "officers of justice" (1809–1828) ===
In March 1809, the Caledon administration appointed a landdrost to administer the district. This gave the district the status of a drostdy. The landdrost's responsibilities included law and order, and he had a few police riders to patrol the district, guard prisoners, keep the peace, enforce the liquor laws and prevent smuggling. From 1812, the landdrost was assisted by an under-sheriff, who supervised the law enforcement officers.

== 1825–1882 ==
=== Police Office (1825–1840) ===
In November 1825, the Somerset administration established a Police Office to oversee both the under-sheriff and his men, and the night watch. Its duties included suppressing riots and breaches of the peace, removing public nuisances, maintaining peace and decorum in public places, maintaining Table Bay port regulations, protecting property, supervising foreigners, locking up vagrants, maintaining order in markets and taverns and retail shops, and registering births and deaths and various licences.

A police court, presided over by a commissioner (later called 'Judge of Police'), was established in May 1826 to try police cases in Cape Town. From January 1828, the court also had jurisdiction in the Cape Drostdy.

The Police Office was headed by a Superintendent of Police, a post held by Baron Charles de Lorentz from 1826 to 1860. From 1834, he also presided over the police court, his title being changed to 'Judge and Superintendent of Police'.

=== Resident magistrates' police (1828–1848) ===
Under the new system of courts introduced in January 1828, the landdrosts' judicial duties were transferred to resident magistrates. The Cape drostdy was divided into two magisterial districts: Cape (i.e. Cape Town) and Simon's Town. The magistrates took over the landdrost's police riders.

The southern part of the Cape district, including Simon's Town, was formed into the Wynberg magisterial district in March 1839. Simon's Town and its environs were proclaimed a separate district again in March 1848.

=== Town Police (1840–1882) ===
In May 1840, the Napier administration replaced the Police Office with the Town Police, a professional police force, modeled on the London Metropolitan Police. Its functions were defined as preserving the peace, preventing crime, apprehending offenders, and enforcing the Lord's Day Observance Ordinance and the liquor licensing laws. The force was confined to the Cape Town municipal area, but could pursue fleeing offenders anywhere within the Cape district.

The Town Police were headed by an Inspector of Police, who reported to the Judge & Superintendent. John King, recruited from the London 'Met', was the first inspector. Headquarters were at 35 Burg Street, Cape Town.

The Town Police were severely tested during the 1849–50 Convict crisis, which saw many incidents of public violence and unrest.

The police court was closed in 1860. After that, police cases were heard in the magistrate's court, and the Inspector of Police was under the authority of the magistrate instead of a superintendent.

=== 'Rural' police forces (1848–1882) ===
From 1848, each magisterial district in the colony had a small uniformed police force, headed by a chief constable who reported to the magistrate. These forces were known collectively as the "rural police". Simon's Town established its police force, under John Kinsley, in March 1848. Wynberg followed, with the appointment of Thomas Shannon as chief constable in April 1848. The Cape district police force was established under Thomas Pope in May 1848. His headquarters were at Papendorp (later Woodstock).

=== Water Police (1860–1882) ===
The Grey administration formed the Water Police in September 1860, to prevent theft in ships and on the wharves, suppress mutinies, and protect property and maintain order in Table Bay harbour. William Scott was the first Boat Officer in charge of the Water Police. The post was upgraded to inspector in 1880.

== 1882–1913 ==
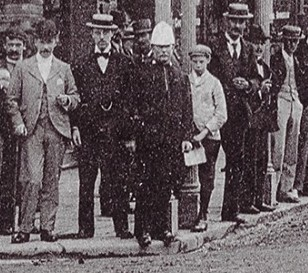
A Cape Peninsula Urban Police officer (centre) on Adderley Street around the turn of the 20th century.

=== Cape Police District No 1 (1882–1888) ===
The Scanlen ministry had the Police Regulation Act passed in 1882, to enable the government to establish police forces. The Act authorised it to declare "police districts" and establish police forces for them, to preserve the peace, prevent crime and apprehend offenders. These forces were "chiefly intended for the detection and investigation of crime and the arrest of offenders." They were known collectively as the 'Cape Police'.

The Cape Town, Wynberg and Simon's Town districts were proclaimed as District No 1 in August 1882, and Bernard V. Shaw, formerly of the London 'Met', was appointed commissioner. He had direct control over the Town Police (which he renamed 'City Police') and the Water Police (which he renamed 'Dock & Harbour Police'). By arrangement with the Wynberg and Simon's Town magistrates, he had operational control over their police too, but they remained under the magistrates' ultimate authority. The Wynberg district police were later renamed 'Suburban Police'.

By 1883, the City Police had at least one detective.

Police stations were opened in Sir Lowry Road (Cape Town), Claremont and Sea Point.

From 1884, headquarters, the police stations and the Dock & Harbour Police were connected by telephone.

Cape Police District No 1 was closed in 1888. The commissioner's authority was transferred to the assistant magistrate of Cape Town, who was given the title 'Chief of Police'.

=== City, Suburban and Simon's Town Police (1888–1901) ===
City Police headquarters moved from Burg Street to Wale Street, Cape Town in 1890.

Several more police stations were opened in Cape Town and neighbouring villages during the 1890s, namely Constantia, Hout Bay, Maitland, Durbanville, Kloof Street (Cape Town), Durban Road (later 'Bellville') (1895), Observatory, Philadelphia, Philippi, Kalk Bay and Muizenberg.

A detective department, headed by a detective sub-inspector, was established in 1894.

=== Cape Police District No 3 (1901–1904) ===
The City Police, Dock & Harbour Police, Suburban Police and Simon's Town Police were combined as Cape Police District No 3 in November 1901. Lt Col Macleod Robinson was commissioner.

District No 3 was divided into A Division (Cape Town, except the docks), Green & Sea Point and Camps Bay); B Division (Docks); and C Division (the rest of the Cape district, Wynberg and Simon's Town districts). This organisation was later changed to HQ Division (Cape Town and Camps Bay); A Division (Docks and Green & Sea Point); B Division (Woodstock and Maitland); and C Division (rest of Cape district, Wynberg and Simon's Town districts).

A Morals Squad was established in 1902 to deal with prostitution.

Two more police stations were opened in Cape Town : one in Hanover Street (District Six (1902) and one in Riebeeck Street (1903).

=== Cape Peninsula Urban Police District (1904–1913) ===
In April 1904. the government amalgamated the mounted divisions of the Cape Police districts into a single Cape Mounted Police. It combined the Cape Peninsula and other urban police forces into the 'Urban Police District'. District Inspector Robert Crawford was appointed commissioner. As this fragmented district proved unsatisfactory, most of the towns concerned were transferred to the CMP, and Cape Town and Kimberley each became an UPD in its own right.

Crawford was Commissioner of the Cape Peninsula UPD until 1913.

A fingerprint registry was established in 1904, and soon proved useful.

=== South African Police (1913) ===
The Cape Peninsula Urban Police were taken over by the new South African Police in April 1913. Since then, Cape Town and its environs have been the responsibility of the national police services (SAPS).

== See also ==
- Criminal investigation
- List of law enforcement agencies in South Africa
- South African Police
- South African Police Service
- Municipal Police (South Africa)
