= List of mounted police units =

The following is a list of mounted police units in the world:

== Angola ==
- Mounted Police Unit (Unidade de Polícia Montada)

== Argentina ==
- Mounted Police Corps of the Argentine Federal Police (Cuerpo de Policia Montada de la Policia Federal Argentina)

== Australia ==
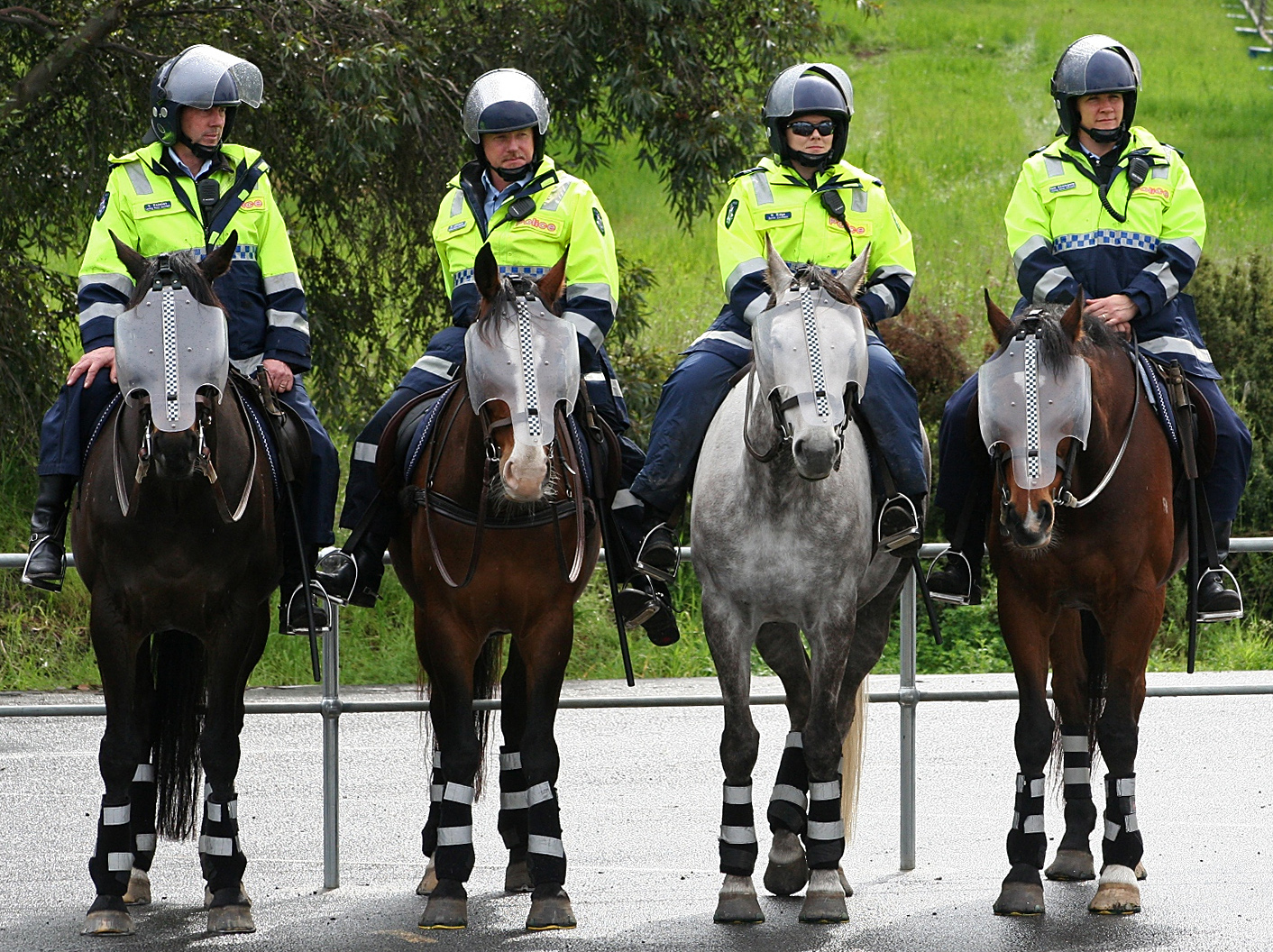
Victoria Police

- New South Wales Police Force Mounted Police Unit
- Queensland Police Service Mounted Police Unit
- South Australia Mounted Police Cadre
- Victoria Police Mounted Branch
- Western Australia Police Force Mounted Section
- Australian Federal Police Ceremonial Mounted Cadre

== Barbados ==
- Royal Barbados Police Force Mounted Troop

== Belgium ==
- Cavalry department, part of the General Reserve of the Federal Police.
- Royal Mounted Escort (Escorte Royale à Cheval – Koninklijk Escorte te Paard)

== Brazil ==
Regimento de Cavalaria 9 de Julho on patrol.

- Military Police of Paraná State Regimento de Polícia Montada Coronel Dulcídio
- Polícia Militar do Estado de Goiás Regimento de Cavalaria
- Polícia Militar do Estado de São Paulo Regimento de Cavalaria 9 de Julho
- Polícia Militar do Estado do Ceará Regimento de Polícia Montada Coronel Moura Brasil
- Polícia Militar de Minas Gerais Regimento de Cavalaria Alferes Tiradentes (RCAT) established 1775, originally under the name of Regimento Regular de Cavalaria de Minas
- Polícia Militar da Bahia Esquadrão de Polícia Montada

== Bulgaria ==
- Sofia Metropolitan Directorate of Interior Cavalry Squadron, Sofia (since 1956)

== Canada ==
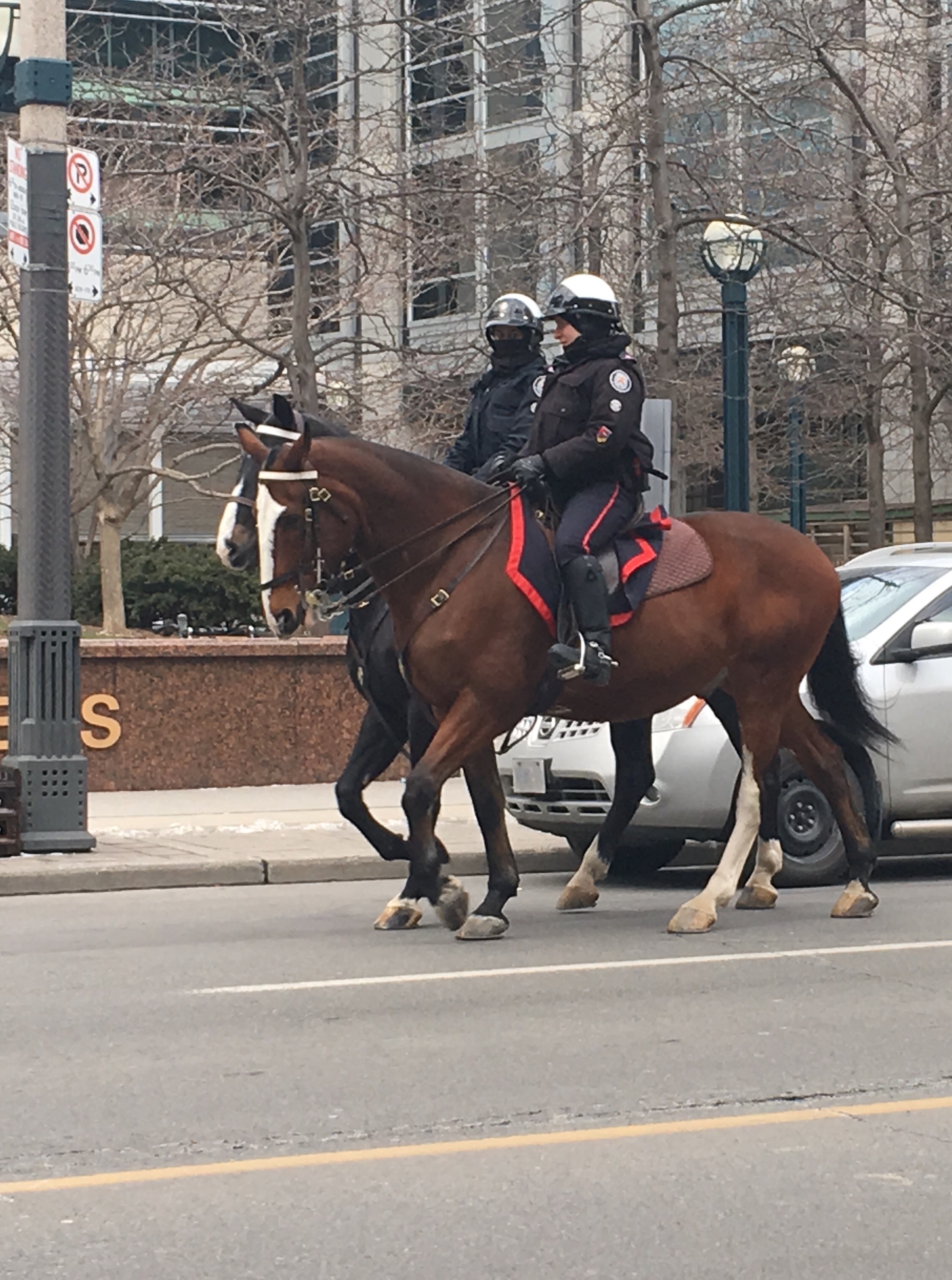
Members of the Toronto Police Service Mounted Unit on patrol

Mounted unit	Year formed	No. of horses
Calgary Police Service Mounted Patrol Unit	1979 (Note: The year 1979 was when the current mounted unit was formed. The first Calgary Police Service mounted unit was formed in 1910, and ran until 1939. From 1940 to 1944, a mounted constabulary presence was maintained by the Calgary Special Constabulary, and later the Calgary Mounted Constabulary.)	7 as of 2022
Halifax Regional Police Mounted Unit	1905 (Note: The year 1905 was when the current unit was formed. The first mounted unit formed by Halifax Police was in 1869, although it was disbanded shortly after.)	2 as of 2021
Hamilton Police Service Mounted Patrol Unit	2010	5 as of 2020
Kingston Police Force Mounted Unit	1998	0 (disbanded in 2023)
Royal Canadian Mounted Police Musical Ride (Note: The following is an equestrian showcase unit and is not used operationally. The RCMP, and its predecessor, the Royal North West Mounted Police, once operated as a mounted police force although it no longer functions as such.)	1887	32 as of 2024
Niagara Regional Police Service Mounted Police Unit	2008	0 (disbanded in 2010)
Royal Newfoundland Constabulary Mounted Unit	2003 (Note: The year 2003 was when the current unit was formed. The first mounted unit formed by the Royal Newfoundland Constabulary was in 1873, although it was disbanded in 1951.)	3 As of 2024
Service de police de la Ville de Montréal Cavalry	1885	8 as of 2024
Toronto Police Service Mounted Unit	1886	27 as of 2023
Vancouver Police Department Mounted Unit	1951 (Note: The year 1951 was when the current unit was formed. The first mounted unit formed by the Vancouver Police Department was in 1908, although it was disbanded in 1949.)	8 as of 2024
Winnipeg Police Service Mounted Patrol Unit	1998	0 (disbanded in 2015)

== Chile ==
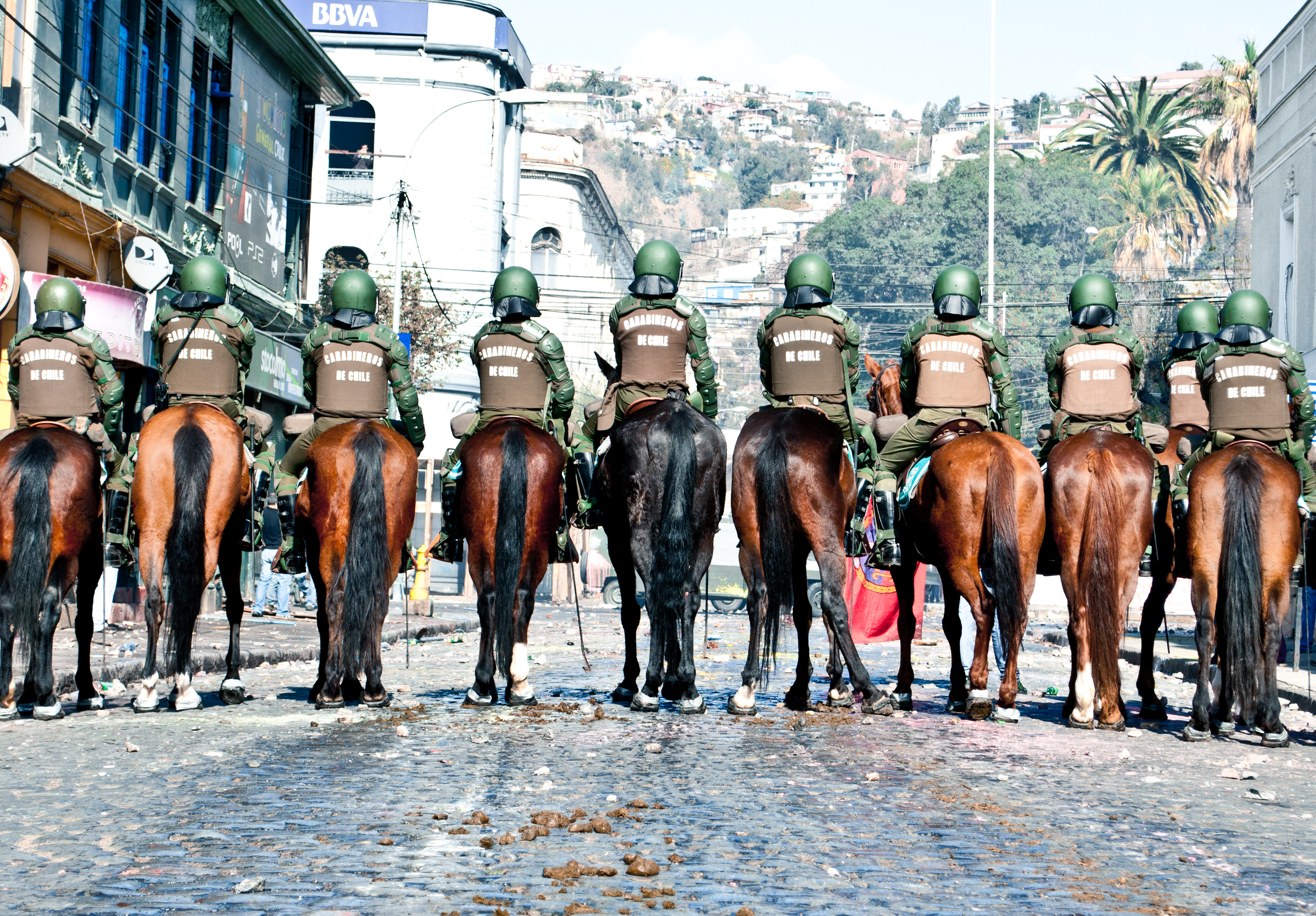
Mounted Carabineros de Chile

- Carabiners of Chile Cavalry Training School "General Óscar Cristi Gallo" (Escuela de Caballería de Carabineros "General Óscar Cristi Gallo")

== China ==
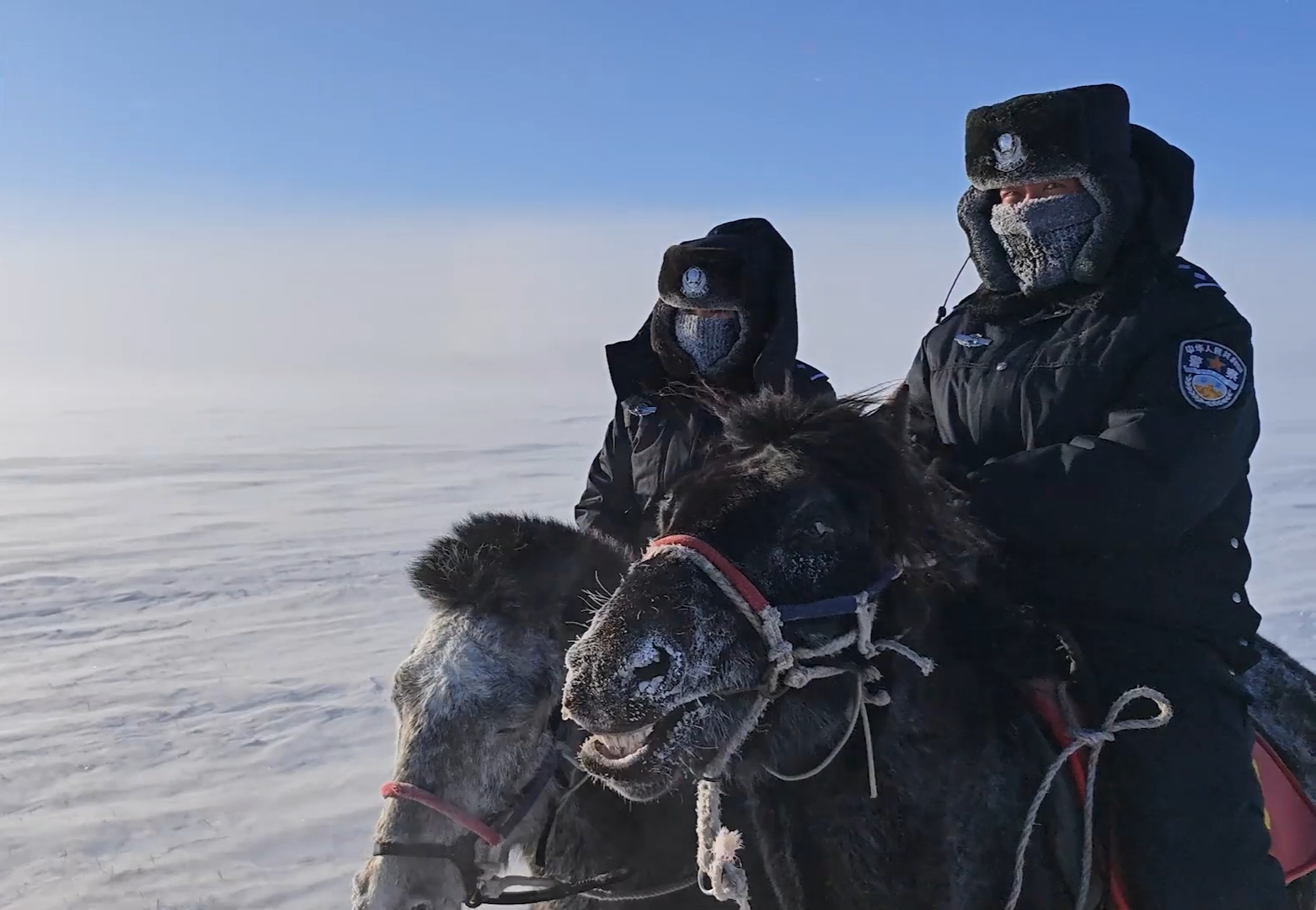
Mounted police in Xilingol League, Inner Mongolia

- Gyrfalcon Mounted Police Team (Chinese: “海东青”骑警队)
- Mounted policewomen unit
- Grassland mounted police force under the Public security bureau

== Colombia ==
- Colombian Carabineers (Carabineros de Colombia)

== Denmark ==
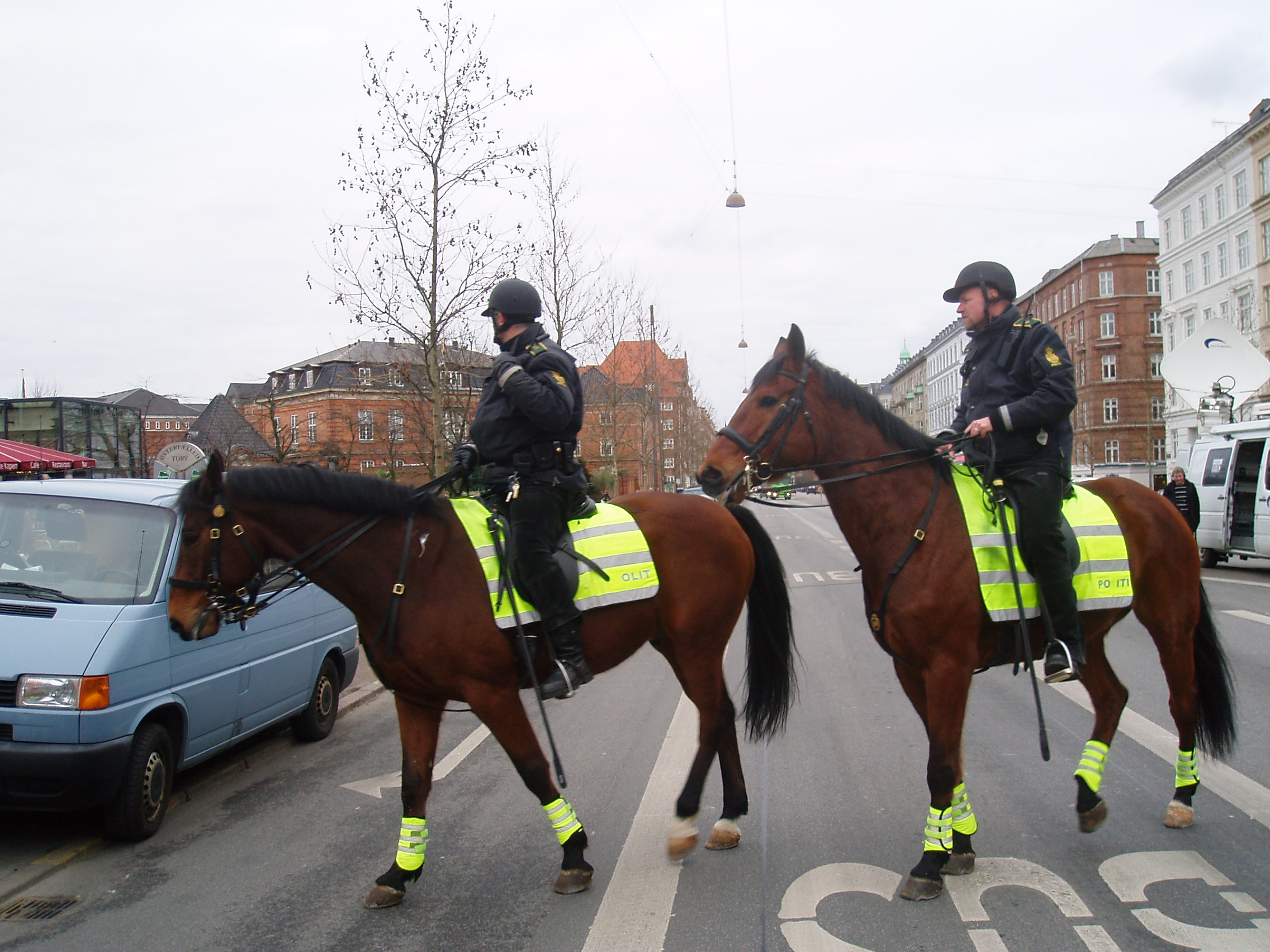
Mounted police in central Copenhagen, 2008

- Københavns Politi (Copenhagen Police), horses disappeared in the 70's but was reestablished in 1998.

== France ==
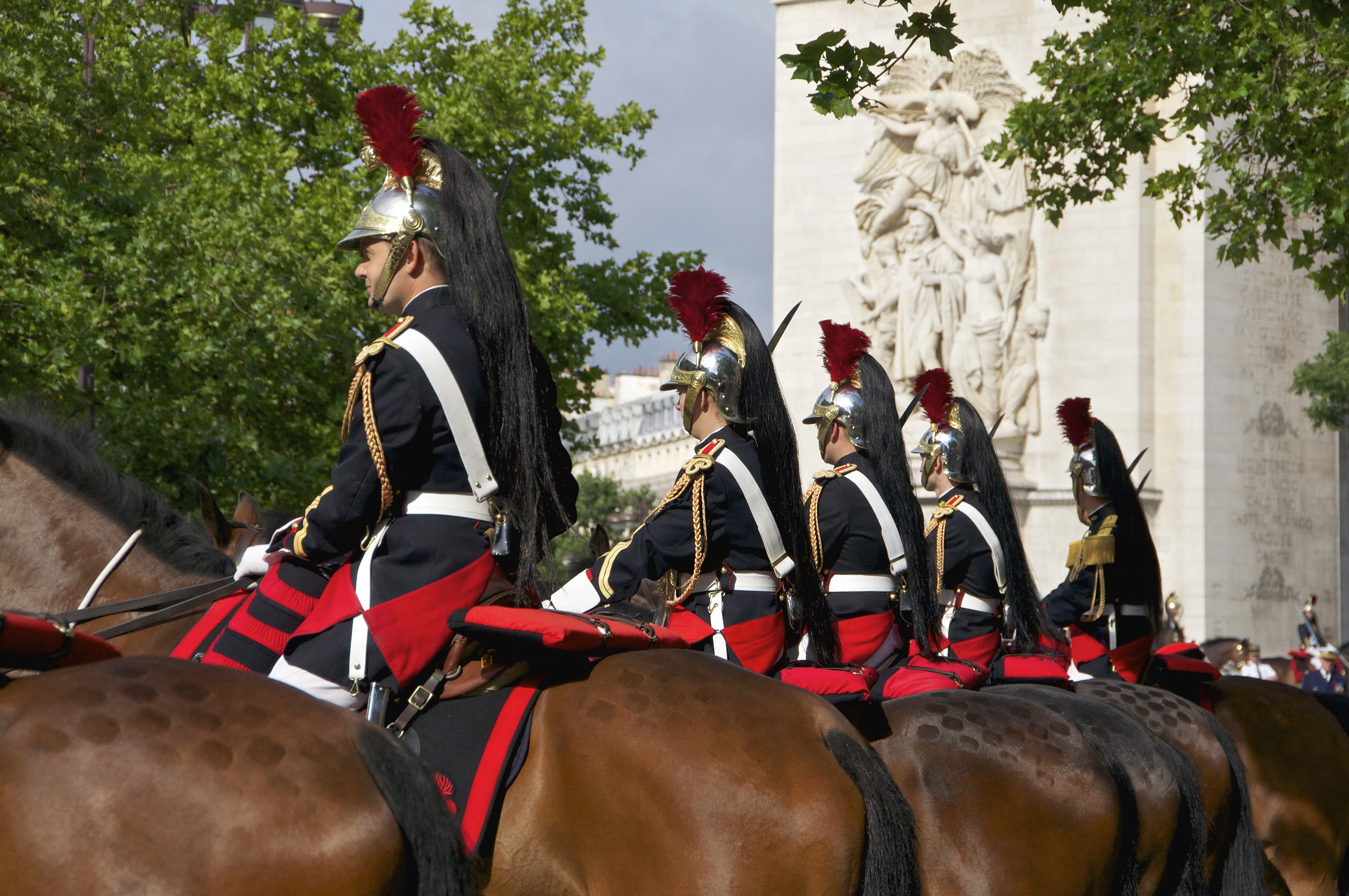
Garde Républicaine, Arc de Triomphe 14 juillet 2012

- Brigade équestre de la Police Nationale (since 1994)
- Garde Républicaine#Regiment of cavalry

== Finland ==
- Helsinki Mounted Police Helsingin Ratsupoliisi (since 1882)

== Germany ==
- Reiterstaffel Baden-Württemberg
- Reiterstaffel Bayern
- Reiterstaffel Bundespolizei
- Reiterstaffel Hessen
- Reiterstaffel Niedersachsen
- Reiterstaffel Nordrhein-Westfalen – 32 horses
- Reiterstaffel Sachsen

== Greece ==
- Hellenic Mounted Police (Ελληνική Έφιππη Αστυνομία)

== India ==
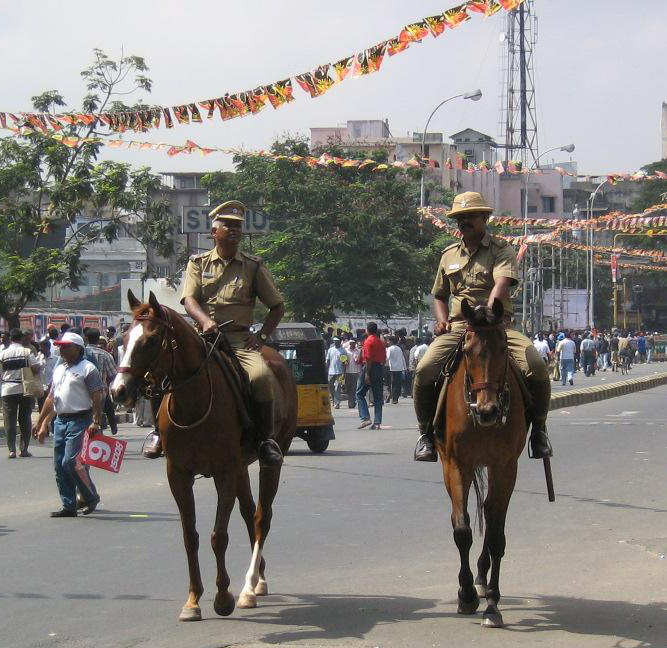
Mounted police in Chennai

- Gujarat Police Mounted Police Unit
- Kolkata Police Mounted Police Unit
- Kerala Police Mounted Police Unit
- Karnataka Police Mounted Police Unit
- Uttarakhand Police Horse mounted unit
- Hyderabad Police Mounted Police Unit
- Chennai Police Mounted Police Unit

== Iran ==
- ASVARAN, Mounted Police Unit of Law Enforcement Force of Islamic Republic of Iran

== Ireland ==
- Garda Mounted Support Unit

== Israel ==
- Israeli Police Horses and Dogs Section

== Italy ==
- 4th Carabinieri Mounted Regiment – Rome
- Polizia di Stato Horse Services Coordination Center – Ladispoli
  - Mounted Squad "Lamarmora" – Rome
  - Mounted Squad "Villa Umberto" – Rome
  - Mounted Squad "Tor di Quinto" – Rome
  - Mounted Squad – Milan
  - Mounted Squad – Florence
  - Mounted Squad – Naples
  - Mounted Squad – Palermo
  - Mounted Squad – Catania
  - Mounted Squad – Turin

== Jamaica ==
- Jamaica Constabulary Force Mounted Troop Division

== Japan ==
- Tokyo Metropolitan Police Department – 15 horses
- National Police Agency (Japan) Imperial Guard (Guard of Honour) – 14 horses
- Kyoto Prefectural Police Heiann-Kibatai – 16 horses

== Latvia ==
- Latvian State police – mounted police patrols in Riga established in 2000.

== Lesotho ==
- Lesotho Mounted Police Service

== Lithuania ==
- Vilnius county police – mounted police patrols in Vilnius – 20 horses.

== Malaysia ==
- Royal Malaysia Police – mounted police patrols by PGA Briged Kuala Lumpur.

== Malta ==
- Malta Police Force

== Mexico ==
- Guardia Rural

== Montenegro ==
- Tim policije na konjima Mounted Police Team – 10 horses, established 2007

== Netherlands ==
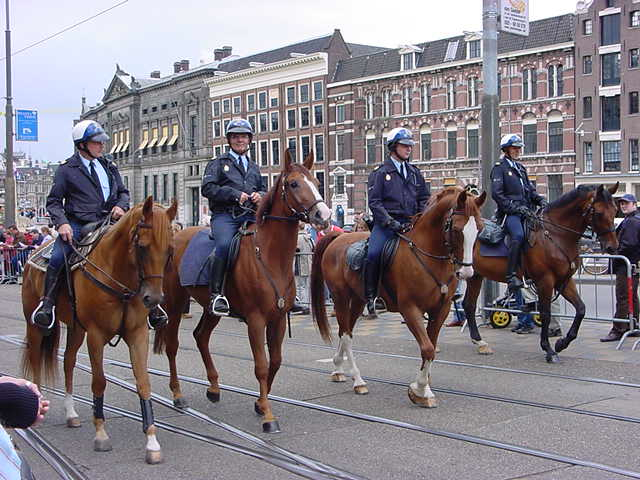
Mounted police in Amsterdam

- Dutch National Police Specialist Operations Service (DSO)

== Norway ==
- Oslo Police District, Rytterkorpset (Special Services Section), aka "Det Ridende Politi" / "The Mounted Police" at Oslo Politidistrikt, (Spesialseksjonen), in Oslo that was established in 1893, (Centennial in 1993 celebrated with celebratory ride across the USA) At present 15 horses and around 25 officers.

== Poland ==
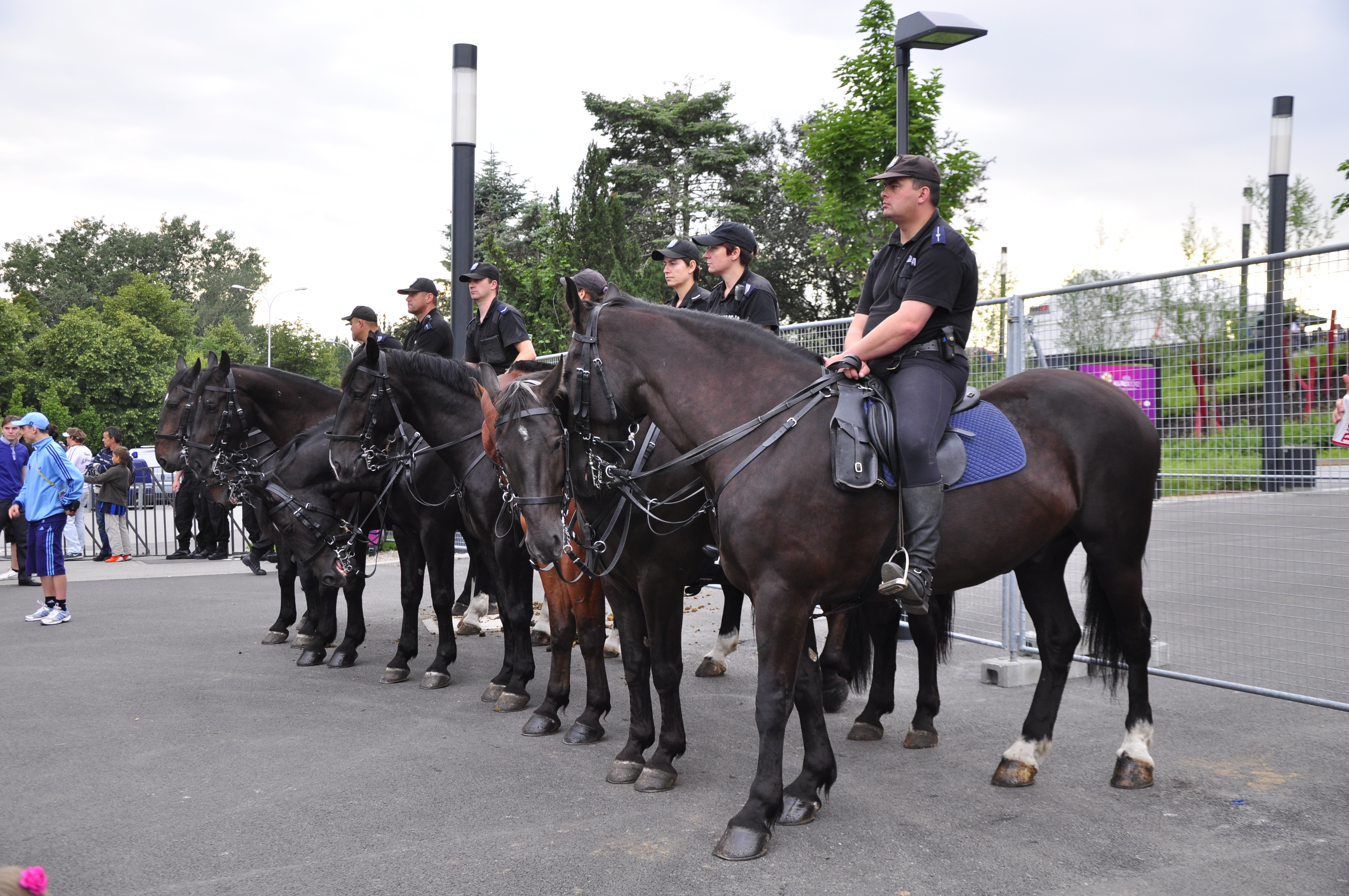
Mounted police in Warsaw

- Komenda Miejska Policji w Chorzowie Mounted Team of Prevention Section
- Komenda Miejska Policji w Częstochowie Mounted Team
- Komenda Miejska Policji w Poznaniu Mounted Platoon
- Komenda Miejska Policji w Szczecinie Mounted Unit
- Komenda Stołeczna Policji w Warszawie Mounted Platoon

== Portugal ==
- Guarda Nacional Republicana Regimento de Cavalaria

== Romania ==
- Jandarmeria Română Mounted Detachment, established 1893
- Bucharest Local Police – 24 horses mounted patrol unit
- Iași Local Police – 6 horses mounted patrol unit

== Serbia ==
- Serbian Police, Police Directorate for the City of Belgrade, Special Police Unit – Police Brigade, Mounted Unit

== South Africa ==
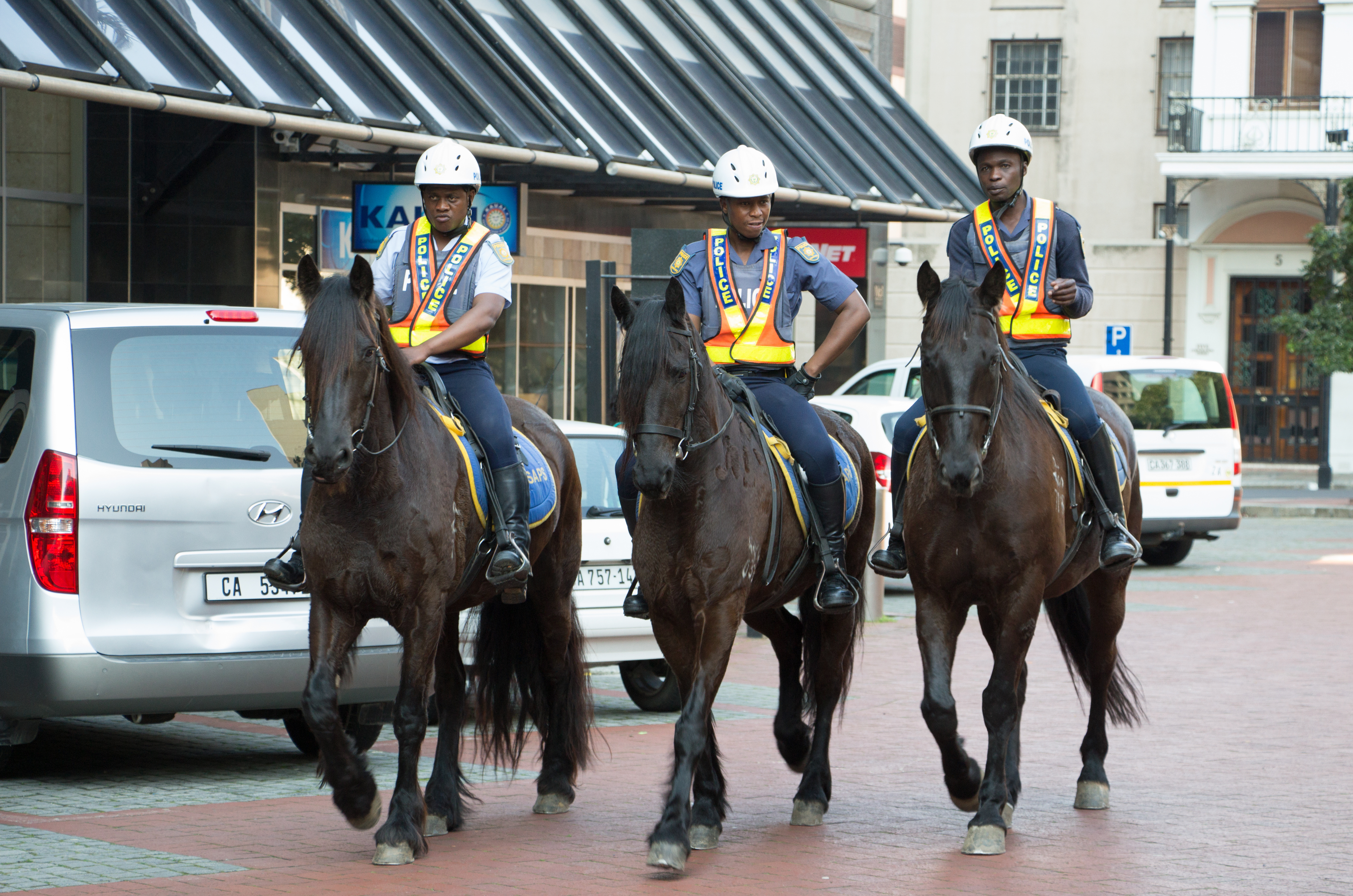
Mounted police in Cape Town

- Frontier Armed and Mounted Police (1855–1878)
- Northern Border Police (1868–1873 and 1879–1882)
- Natal Police (originally Natal Mounted Police) (1874–1913)
- Cape Mounted Police (originally Cape Police)(1882–1913)
- Bechuanaland Mounted Police (1884–1885)
- South African Constabulary (1900–1908)
- South African Police Service Pretoria Mounted Unit

== Spain ==
- Civil Guard Cavalry Squad (1844–present)
- National Police Cavalry Units (1825–present). Since 1986 with the current name.
- Other police units of local and regional level also have some cavalry units.

== Sri Lanka ==
- Sri Lanka Police Mounted Division

== Sweden ==
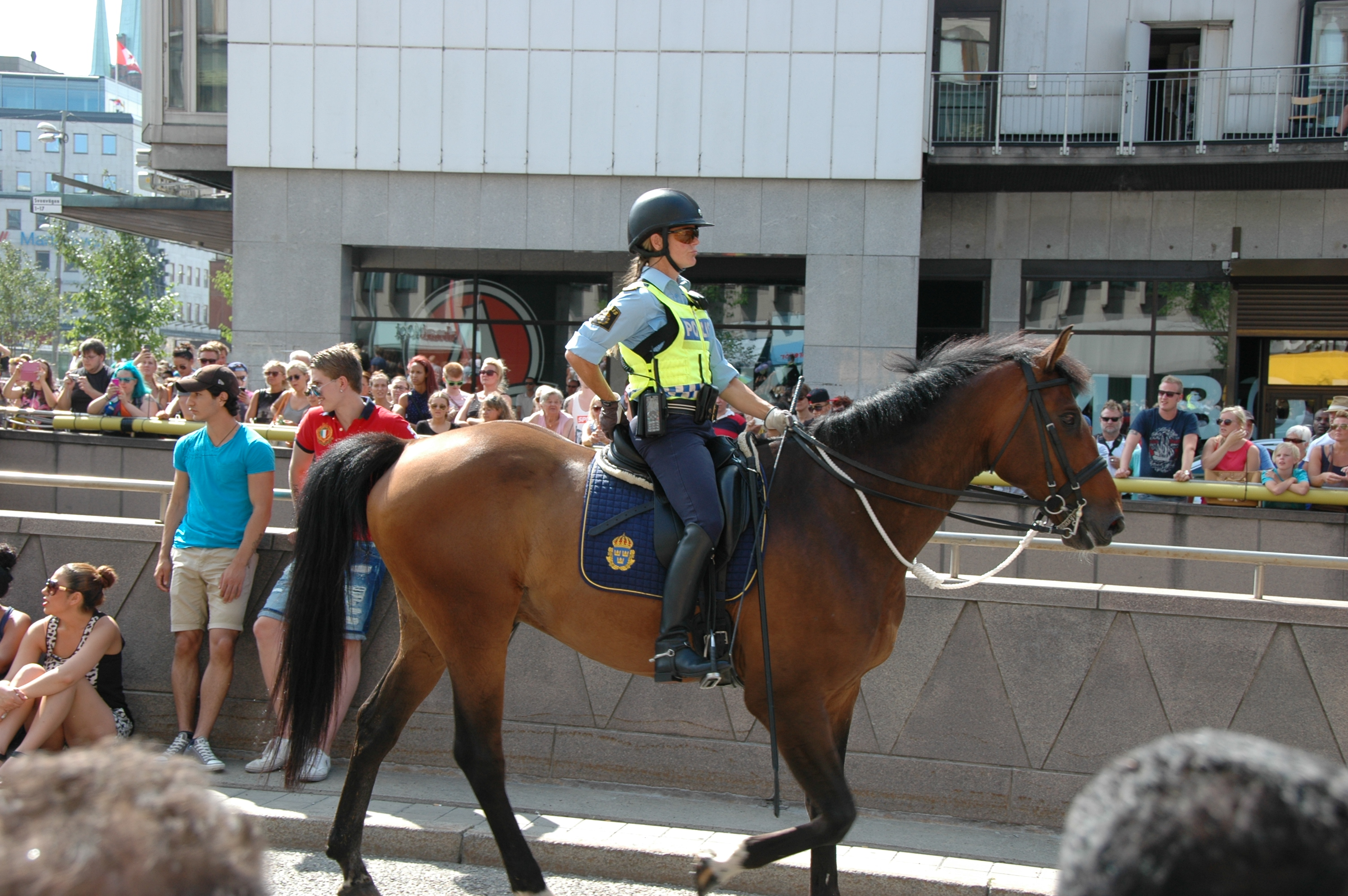
Mounted police officer in Stockholm on Sveavägen near Sergels torg, photo from 2014.

The Swedish Police Authority have mounted units in the three largest cities (Stockholm, Göteborg, and Malmö) These units can be dispatched all over Sweden.

== Switzerland ==
As of 2009, the following Swiss police forces employ mounted units:

- Cantonal Police of Bern (since 1914, eleven officers)
- Police in Martigny
- Police in St. Gallen (since June 2009)

== Taiwan ==
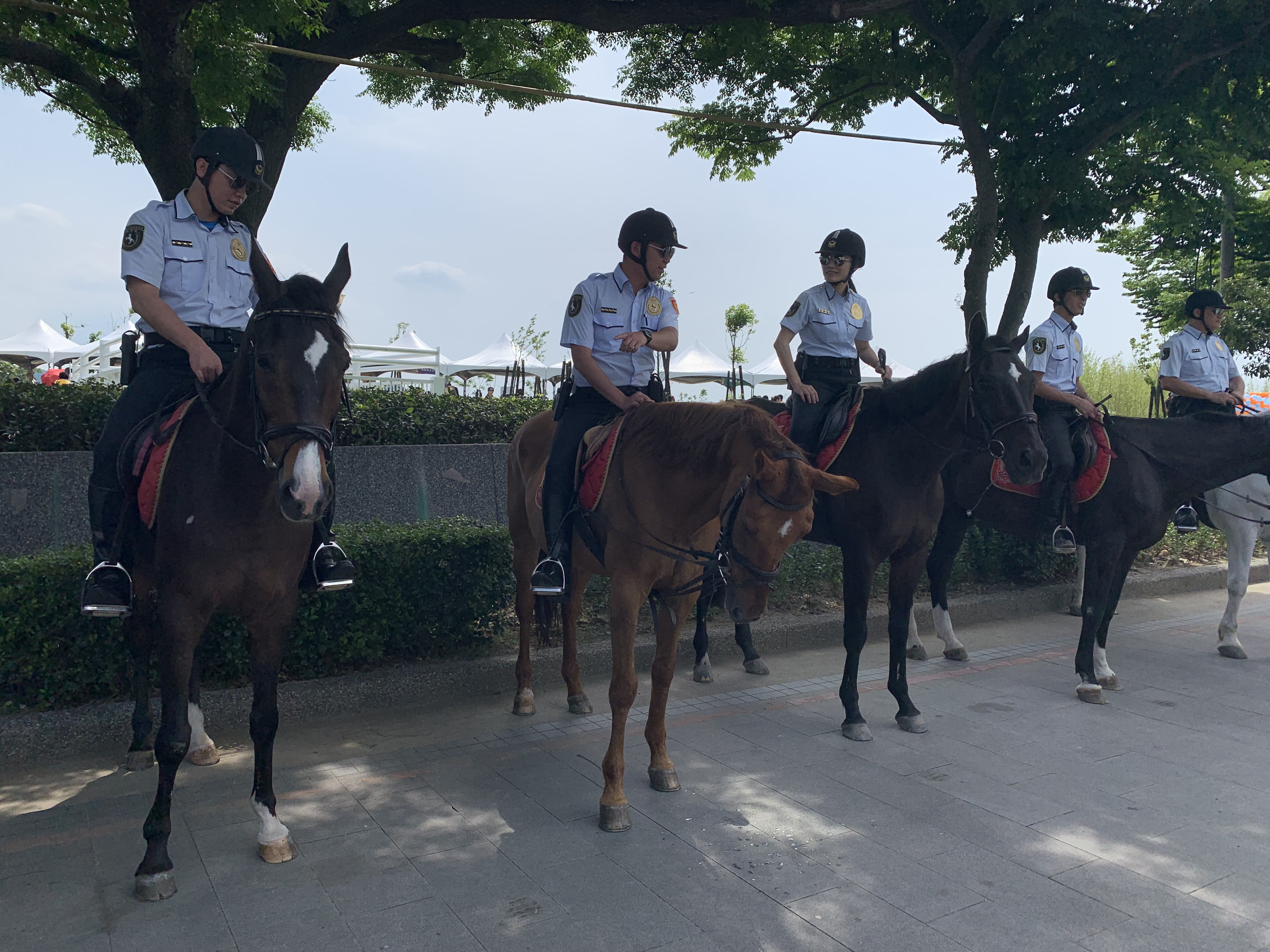
Members of Mounted Police Unit of New Taipei City Police Department

- Mounted Police Unit of New Taipei City Police Department (since 2003)
- Mounted Police Unit of Kaohsiung Police Department (since 2005)

== United Kingdom ==
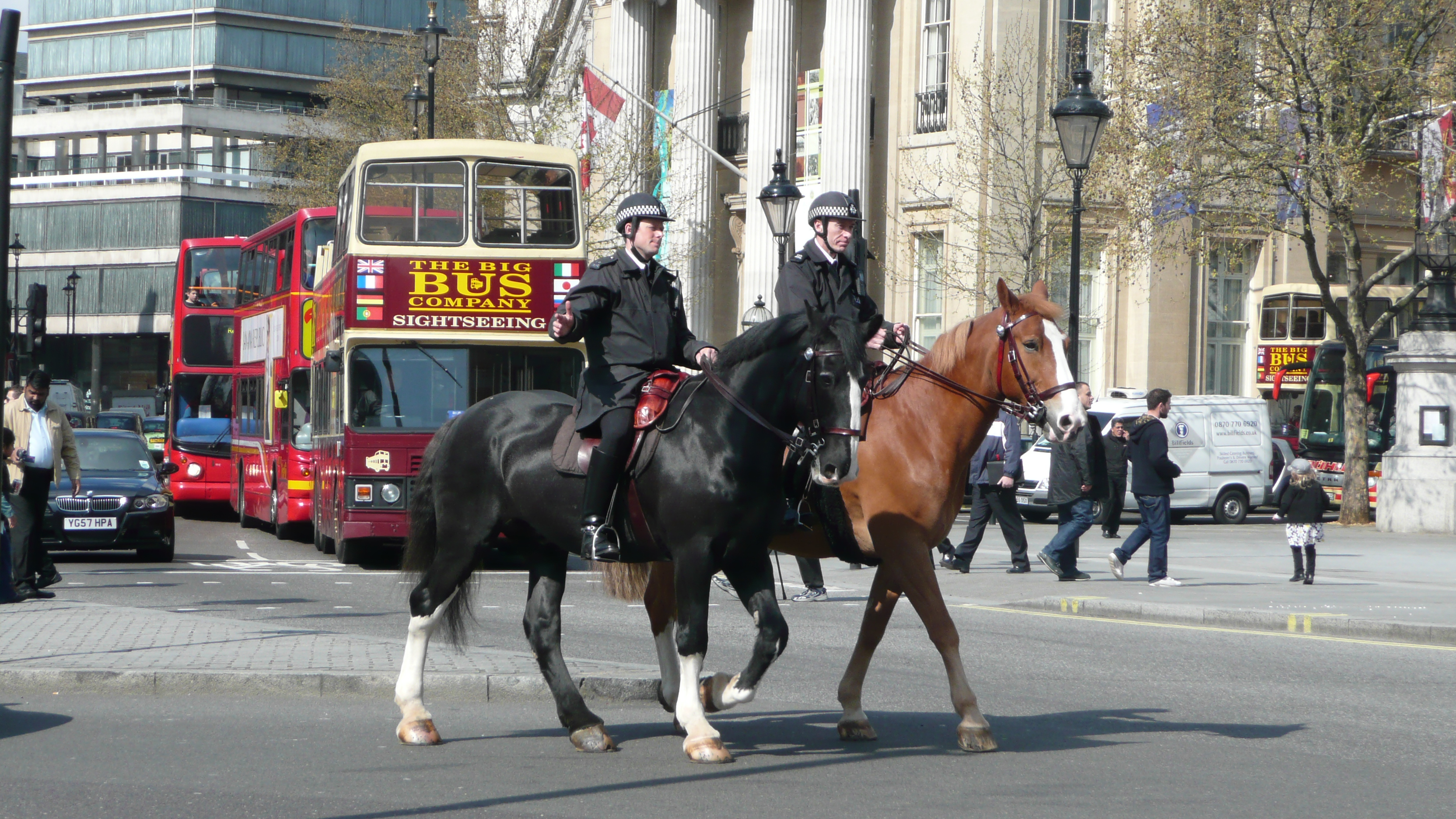
Metropolitan Police in Trafalgar Square, London

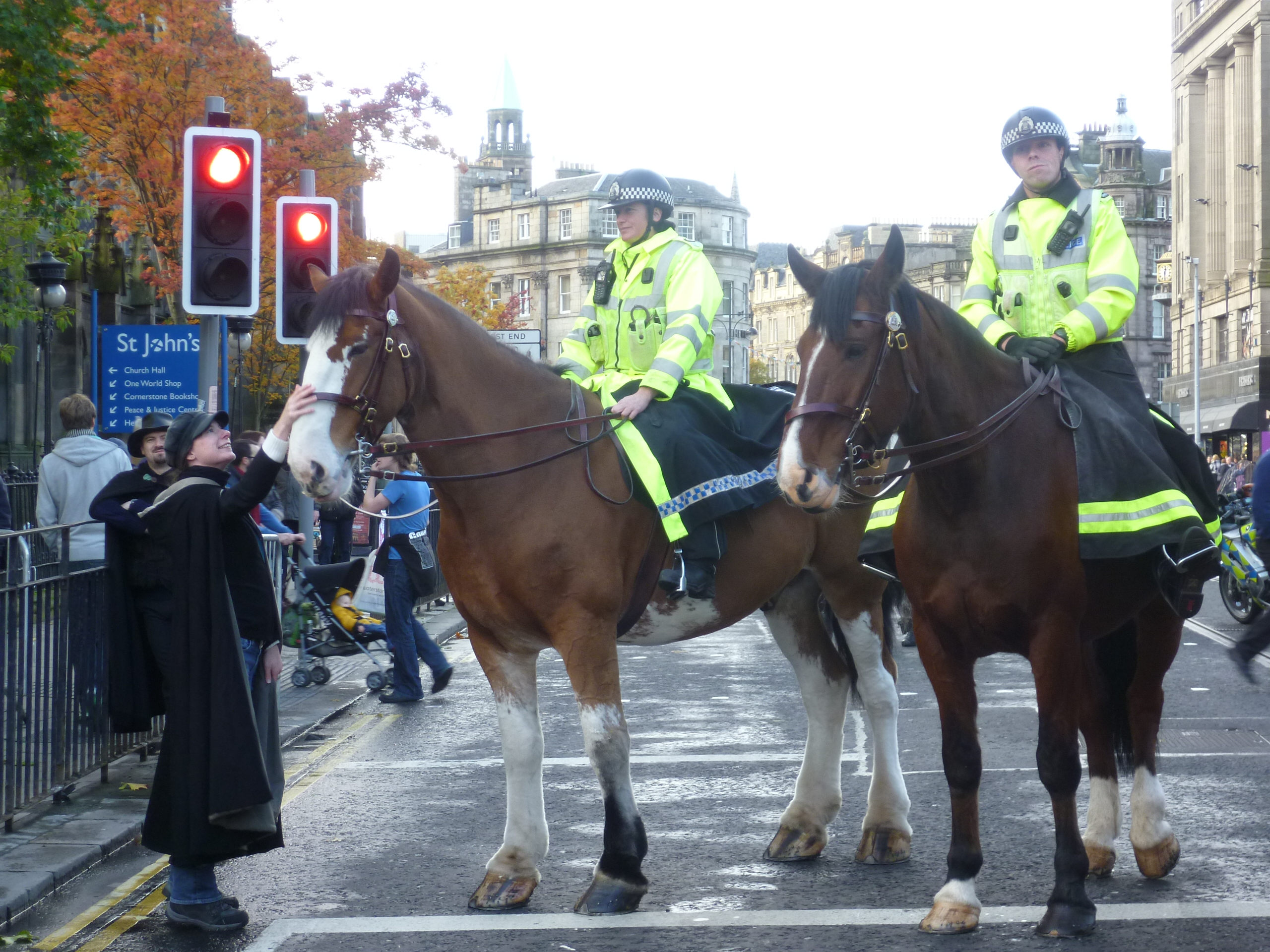
Mounted police in Princes Street, Edinburgh

=== Active mounted sections ===
- Avon and Somerset Constabulary Mounted Section
- City of London Police Mounted Unit
- Gloucestershire Constabulary Mounted Section (re-established in 2016)
- Greater Manchester Police Mounted Unit
- Lancashire Constabulary Mounted Branch
- Merseyside Police Mounted Section
- Metropolitan Police Mounted Branch
- Northumbria Police Mounted Unit
- Police Service of Scotland Mounted Branch
- South Wales Police Mounted Unit
- South Yorkshire Police Mounted Section
- Thames Valley Police Mounted Section
- West Midlands Police Mounted Branch (re-established in 2025)
- West Yorkshire Police Mounted Section

=== Recently disbanded sections ===
- Royal Military Police Mounted Troop (disbanded in 1995)
- North Yorkshire Police Mounted Unit (disbanded in 1998)
- Royal Parks Constabulary Mounted Branch (absorbed into Metropolitan Police in 2004)
- Essex Police Mounted Unit (disbanded in 2012)
- Nottinghamshire Police Mounted Unit (disbanded in 2012)

== United States ==
=== Alabama ===
- DeKalb County Sheriff's Office Mounted Unit, Alabama
- Etowah County Sheriff's Mounted Unit, Alabama
- Florence Police Mounted Patrol, Alabama
- Mobile County Sheriffs Office Mounted Unit, Mobile, Alabama
- Mobile Police Department Mounted Unit, Alabama

=== Arizona ===
- Coconino County Sheriff's Office Mounted Unit, Arizona
- Maricopa County Sheriff's Office Mounted Unit, Arizona
- Scottsdale Police Department Mounted Unit, Arizona
- Tempe Police Department Mounted Unit, Arizona

=== Arkansas ===
- Little Rock Police Department Mounted Unit, Little Rock, Arkansas

=== California ===
- Anaheim Police Department Mounted Enforcement Unit, California
- East Bay Regional Park District Police Department Mounted Patrol Unit, California
- Frank G. Bonelli Regional Park Volunteer Mounted Assistance Unit, San Dimas, California
- Los Angeles Police Department Mounted Unit, California
- Los Angeles County Sheriff's Department Mounted Enforcement Detail, California
- Modesto Police Department Mounted Unit, California
- Orange County Sheriff's Department Mounted Unit, California
- Placer County Sheriff's Office Mounted Unit, California
- Sacramento County Sheriff's Department Mounted Enforcement Detail, California
- Sacramento Police Department Mounted Patrol Unit, California
- San Diego Sheriff Volunteer Mounted Patrol Unit, California
- San Francisco Police Department Mounted Patrol Unit, California
- San Jose Police Department Mounted Unit, California
- Santa Barbara County Sheriff's Office Mounted Unit, California
- Stanislaus County Sheriff's Department Mounted Unit, California

=== Colorado ===
- Denver Police Department Mounted Patrol, Colorado
- El Paso Sheriffs Office Mounted Unit, El Paso County, Colorado
- Larimer County Sheriff's Office Mounted Posse, Colorado
- Douglas County Sheriff's Office
- Weld County Sheriff's Mounted Posse
- Parker Police Department

=== Delaware ===
- New Castle County Police Department Mounted Patrol Unit, Delaware

=== District of Columbia ===
- United States Park Police Horse Mounted Unit
- Metropolitan Police Department, District of Columbia, Horse Mounted Unit

=== Florida ===
- Webster Police Department Mounted Patrol Unit, Florida
- Citrus County Mounted Posse, Inverness, Florida
- Flagler County, Mounted Unit, Florida
- Fort Lauderdale Police Department Mounted Unit, Florida
- Gainesville Police Department Mounted Patrol Unit, Florida
- Hernando County Civilian Mounted Unit, Brooksville, Florida
- Hillsborough County Sheriff Office Mounted Posse Hillsborough County, Florida
- Key West Police Department, Mounted Unit, Florida
- Lake County Sheriff's Office Mounted Unit, Florida
- Leon County Sheriff's Office Mounted Unit, Florida
- City of Miami Police Department Mounted Patrol, Florida
- Orlando Police Department Mounted Patrol Unit, Florida
- Pinellas Park Police Department Mounted Patrol, Florida
- Polk County Sheriff's Office Mounted Enforcement Unit, Florida
- Saint Petersburg Police Department Mounted Patrol Unit, Florida
- Sarasota County Sheriff's Office Mounted Unit, Florida
- Sumter County Mounted Reserve, Webster, Florida
- Tampa Police Department Mounted Patrol, Florida

=== Georgia ===
- Atlanta Police Department Mounted Patrol, Georgia
- Savannah-Chatham Metropolitan Police Department Mounted Unit, Georgia
- Duluth Georgia Police Department
- Fort Valley Police Department Mounted Patrol, Fort Valley, Georgia

=== Hawaii ===
- Honolulu Police Department Horse Patrol Unit, Hawaii

=== Idaho ===
- Boise Police Department Mounted Patrol, Idaho

=== Illinois ===
- Chicago Police Department Mounted Patrol Unit, Illinois
- Palos Park Police Department Mounted Patrol, Illinois

=== Indiana ===
- Indianapolis Metropolitan Police Department Mounted Patrol Section, Indiana
- Wayne County Sheriff's Office, Richmond

=== Iowa ===
- Des Moines Police Department Mounted Patrol, Iowa
- Waterloo Police Department Mounted Patrol Unit, Iowa

=== Kansas ===
- Shawnee County Sheriff's Department Mounted Posse, Kansas
- Wichita Police Department Mounted Unit, Kansas

=== Kentucky ===
- Lexington-Fayette-Urban-County Division of Police Mounted Unit, Kentucky
- Louisville Metro Police Department Mounted Unit, Kentucky
- Kentucky Horse Park Mounted Police Full Service State Agency, Kentucky

=== Louisiana ===
- Baton Rouge Police Department Mounted Patrol
- Lafayette Police Department (Louisiana), Mounted Unit, Louisiana
- Mandeville Police Department, Mounted Unit
- New Orleans Police Department Mounted Unit, Louisiana
- Orleans Parish Sheriff's Office Mounted Division, Louisiana

=== Maine ===
- Portland Police Department Mounted Unit, Maine

=== Maryland ===
- Baltimore City Police Department Mounted Unit, Maryland
- Maryland-National Capital Park Police
- Ocean City Police Department Mounted Unit, Maryland

=== Massachusetts ===
- Hampden County Sheriff's Office Mounted Unit
- Boston Park Rangers Mounted Unit, Massachusetts
- Massachusetts Park Ranger Mounted Unit, DCR
- Massachusetts State Police Mounted Section
- University of Massachusetts-Amherst Police Department Mounted Unit

=== Michigan ===
- Barry County Sheriff Posse Mounted Division, Hastings, Michigan
- Cadillac Police Department Auxiliary Horse Patrol, Michigan
- Detroit Police Department Mounted Unit, Detroit, Michigan
- Eaton County Sheriff's Office Mounted Unit, Michigan
- Kalamazoo County Sheriff Mounted Division, Michigan
- Lenawee County Sheriff Mounted Division, Michigan
- Livingston County Sheriff's Department Mounted Division, Michigan
- Oakland County Sheriff's Department Mounted Division, Michigan
- Ottawa County Sheriff's Office Mounted Unit, Michigan
- Saginaw County Sheriff's Posse Mounted Division, Saginaw
- Washtenaw County Sheriff's Office Mounted Patrol Division, Michigan
- Wayne County Sheriff's Office Mounted Patrol Division, Michigan

=== Minnesota ===
- Duluth Police Department Mounted Patrol, Minnesota

=== Missouri ===
- Columbia Police Department Mounted Patrol Unit, Missouri
- Metropolitan Police Department, City of St. Louis Mounted Patrol Unit, St. Louis, Missouri
- Saint Charles City Police Department Mounted Patrol Unit, Missouri

=== Nebraska ===
- Omaha Police Department Mounted Patrol Unit, Nebraska

=== Nevada ===
- Las Vegas Metropolitan Police Department Mounted Unit, Nevada
- University of Nevada, Las Vegas Police Services Mounted Police Unit, Nevada

=== New Hampshire ===
- Dover Police Department Mounted Patrol, New Hampshire
- Manchester Police Department Mounted Unit, New Hampshire
- Hampton Police Department Mounted Patrol, New Hampshire

=== New Jersey ===
- Camden City Police Department Mounted Unit, New Jersey
- Cape May County Sheriff’s Office Mounted Unit, New Jersey
- Morris County Park Police Mounted Unit, New Jersey
- New Jersey State Police Mounted Unit, New Jersey
- Newark Police Department Mounted Division, Newark, NJ
- Ocean County Sheriff’s Office Mounted Unit, New Jersey
- Passiac County Sheriff’s Office Mounted Unit, New Jersey
- Rutgers University Mounted Patrol (RUMP), New Jersey (only student-run mounted patrol in the United States)
- Union County Police Mounted Patrol Unit, New Jersey

=== New Mexico ===
- Albuquerque Police Department, New Mexico
- Santa Fe Police Department, Santa Fe, New Mexico

=== New York ===
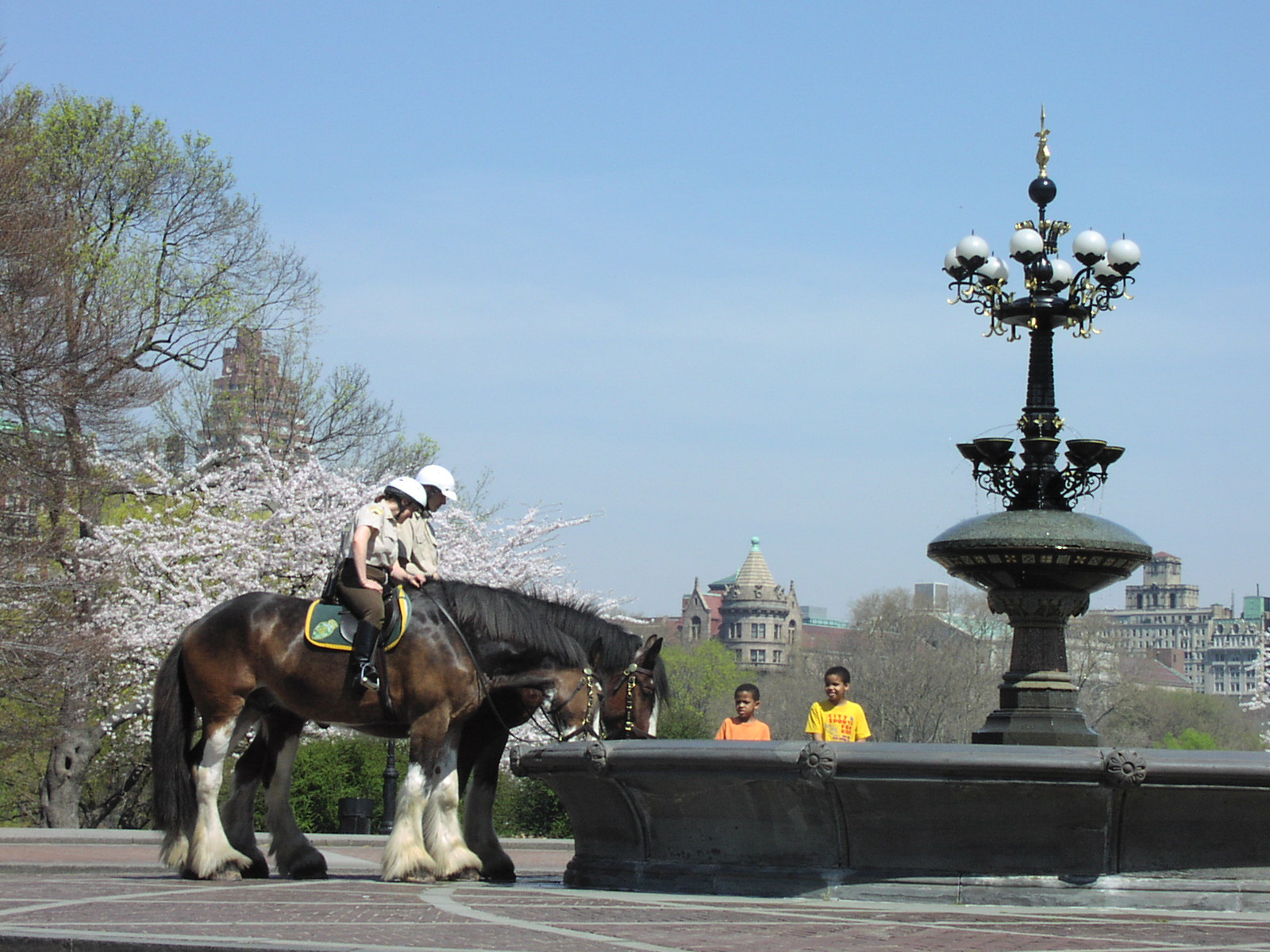
Police horses drinking from a fountain in Central Park

- Albany Police Department, New York
- Nassau County Police Department Mounted Unit, New York
- New York City Police Department Mounted Unit, New York, established 1858
- New York State Park Police Mounted Unit, Saratoga Springs, New York
- Rochester Police Department The Mounted Section, New York
- Saratoga Springs Mounted Patrol, New York
- Westchester County Department of Public Safety Mounted Unit, New York
- Rockland County Sheriff's Office Mounted Police Division (Rockland County, NY)

=== North Carolina ===
- North Carolina State University Police Department Mounted Unit, Raleigh, North Carolina
- Raleigh Police Department Mounted Unit, North Carolina
- Wilmington Police Department, North Carolina

=== Ohio ===
- Franklin County Sheriffs Office Mounted Patrol, Ohio
- Butler County Sheriff's Office Mounted Patrol, Ohio
- Cincinnati Police Department Mounted Patrol, Ohio
- Cleveland Metroparks Police Department Mounted Unit, Greater Cleveland, Ohio
- Cleveland Police Department Mounted Unit, Ohio
- Columbus Division of Police Mounted Unit, Ohio
- Hamilton County Sheriff's Office Mounted Patrol, Ohio
- Lake Metroparks Ranger Department, Mounted Division, Lake County, Ohio
- Ross County Sheriff's Office Mounted Unit, Ohio
- Summit County Sheriff's Office Mounted Patrol, Ohio
- The Ohio State University Police Division Mounted Patrol, Ohio
- Toledo Police Department Mounted Patrol Unit, Ohio
- Willoughby Hills Police Department Mounted Unit, Willoughby Hills, Ohio
- Richland County Sheriff's Office Mounted Unit, Mansfield, Ohio
- Medina County Mounted Unit
- Stark County Mounted Unit
- Lima County Mounted Unit

=== Oklahoma ===
- Oklahoma City Police Department Equine Unit, Oklahoma
- Tulsa County Sheriff's Office, Mounted Patrol Unit, Oklahoma

=== Pennsylvania ===
- Pennsylvania State Police Mounted Unit
- Pittsburgh Bureau of Police Mounted Unit, re-established 2017
- Allegheny County Police Department, Pennsylvania
- Bethlehem Police Department Mounted Patrol Unit, Pennsylvania
- Philadelphia Police Department Mounted Patrol, Pennsylvania disbanded 2004, re-established 2011
- Butler County Mounted Posse, formed in 1972, 40 members, {Butler County Sheriff Dept.}

=== Puerto Rico ===
- Puerto Rico Police Department Puerto Rico Mounted Police (FURA- Rapid Forces of Fast Action)

=== Rhode Island ===
- Providence Police Department Mounted Command, Rhode Island

=== South Carolina ===
- Aiken Department of Public Safety Volunteer Mounted Unit, South Carolina
- Charleston Police Department Horse Patrol, South Carolina
- York County Sheriff’s Office Mounted Patrol, South Carolina

=== Tennessee ===
- Memphis Police Department Mounted Unit, Tennessee
- Metro Nashville Police Department Mounted Unit, Tennessee
- Hendersonville Police Department Mounted Unit, Tennessee

=== Texas ===
- Austin Police Department Mounted Patrol, Texas
- Dallas Police Department Mounted Unit, Texas
- Fort Worth Police Department Mounted Patrol, Texas
- Gregg County Sheriff's Mounted Unit, Texas
- Houston Police Department, Texas
- Lubbock Police Department Mounted Patrol, Texas
- Texas Highway Patrol Mounted Horse Patrol Unit, Texas
- Galveston Police Department Mounted Patrol
- Grand Prairie Mounted Patrol
- McKinney Mounted Patrol

=== United States Park Police ===
- NYC, NY Office, Mounted Unit
- Washington D.C. Office, Mounted Unit
- San Francisco Office, Mounted Unit

=== Virginia ===
- Henrico County Division of Police, Virginia
- Prince William County Police Horse Mounted Patrol Unit, Virginia
- Richmond Police Department Mounted Team, Virginia
- Virginia Beach Police Department, Virginia

=== Washington ===
- Seattle Police Department Mounted Unit, Washington

=== Wisconsin ===
- Madison Police Department Mounted Patrol, Madison, Wisconsin
- UW-Madison Police Department Mounted Patrol, Madison, Wisconsin
- Milwaukee Police Department Mounted Patrol, Wisconsin
- Wisconsin State Fair Park Police Department Mounted Unit, West Allis, Wisconsin

== Vietnam ==
- Đoàn cảnh sát cơ động kỵ binh – Bộ Tư lệnh CSCĐ (2020– )

== Zimbabwe ==
- British South Africa Police (1896-1980)
- Zimbabwe Republic Police Mounted unit (1980– )
