= List of law enforcement agencies in South Africa =

This is a list of agencies in law enforcement in South Africa, both past and present. It does not include the military police branches of the defence forces.

== Pre-Union (1652–1910) ==
=== Cape of Good Hope ===
- Fiscal's law enforcement officers (1652–1840) – Responsible for law and order in Cape Town.
- Night Watch (1686–1840) — Responsible for patrolling the streets of Cape Town at night.
- Magistrates' law enforcement officers (1686–1848) – Responsible forenforcement in the rural districts. Each district's magistrate had his own "officers of justice".
- Police Office (1825–40) – Established in 1825 to co-ordinate the fiscal's law enforcement officers and the Night Watch in Cape Town. It was replaced by the Town Police in 1840.
- Cape Peninsula Urban Police (1840–1913) – Established in 1840 as the Town Police, and modelled on the London Metropolitan Police. – It replaced the Police Office. The force was renamed 'City Police' when it was placed under the control of the Cape Police in 1882. Together with the rural police of the neighbouring districts, it became the 'Cape Peninsula Urban Police District' in 1904. The force was taken over by the South African Police in 1913.
- Rural Police (1848–1913) – Replaced the magistrates' law enforcement officers. Each district had a chief constable and a small police force, under overall direction of the resident magistrate.
- Frontier Force of Rural Police (1850-?)
- Armed and Mounted Police (1853–55)
- Frontier Armed and Mounted Police (1855–78)
- Dock and Harbour Police (1860–1913) — Established in 1860 as the 'Water Police', to maintain law and order in Table Bay harbour. It was renamed 'Dock and Harbour Police' in 1882, and incorporated into Cape Police District 3 in 1901.
- Northern Border Police (1868–73 and 1879–84) — Responsible for law and order in the districts along the Orange River, which formed the colony's northern border at that time.
- Cape Government Railways Police — The Cape Government Railways employed law enforcement officials.
- Cape Mounted Police (1882–1913) — A para-military force established in 1882 as the 'Cape Police'. It was renamed 'Cape Mounted Police' in 1904, and transferred to the Union Defence Forces in 1913.
- Detective Department (1882–1913) — Established to suppress diamond-smuggling on the Griqualand West diamond fields.

=== Natal ===
- Borough police (1854–1936)
- Water Police
- Railways Police
- Natal Mounted Police (1874–94)
- Natal Police (1894–1913)

=== Orange Free State ===
- Rydende Dienst Macht [Mounted Police Force] (1889–1902)
- South African Constabulary (1900–08)
- Orange Free State Police (1908–13) — A para-military force established by the colonial government in 1908 as the 'Orange River Colony Police' to replace the imperial South African Constabulary. It was renamed when the colony reverted to its former name in 1910, and was transferred to the Union Defence Forces in 1913.

=== South African Republic / Transvaal ===
- Rydende Politie [Mounted Police] (1881–86)
- Rydende Artillerie en Politie Korps [Mounted Artillery and Police Corps] (1886–96)
- Zuid Afrikaansche Republiek Politie South African Republic Police (1896–1902)
- South African Constabulary (1900–08)
- Transvaal Town Police (1901–08) — Established by the British occupation authorities to maintain law and order in Pretoria and Johannesburg. It was superseded by the Transvaal Police in 1908.
- Transvaal Police (1908–13) — A para-military force established by the colonial government in 1908, to replace the imperial South African Constabulary and the Transvaal Town Police. It was transferred to the Union Defence Forces in 1913.

=== Griqualand West ===
- Griqualand Constabulary (1872–74)
- Griqualand Mounted Police (1873–74)
- Griqualand West Police (1874–83)
- Border Police.

=== Zululand ===
- Zululand Police (1883–98).

=== British Bechuanaland ===
- Bechuanaland Mounted Police (1884–85)
- Bechuanaland Border Police (1885–95).

== South Africa (1910-1994) ==
- South African Police (1913–94)
- South African Railways Police Force (1916–86).

== Homelands (1976-1994) ==
=== Transkei ===
- Transkei Police (1976–94).

=== Bophuthatswana ===
- Bophuthatswana Police (1977–94)

=== Venda ===
- Venda National Force (1979–85)
- Venda Police (1985–94).

=== KwaZulu ===
- KwaZulu Police (1980–94).

=== Ciskei ===
- Ciskei Police (1981–94).

=== Gazankulu ===
- Gazankulu Police (1982–94).

=== QwaQwa ===
- QwaQwa Police (1983–94).

=== Lebowa ===
- Lebowa Police (1984–95).

=== KaNgwane ===
- KaNgwane Police (1986–94).

=== KwaNdebele ===
- KwaNdebele Police (1987–94).

== South Africa (1994- ) ==
- South African Police Service (1994- )
- Municipal/Metropolitan Police Service (1998- )
- Hawks ( Directorate for Priority Crime Investigation/SAPS) - 2009
