= Municipal Police (South Africa) =

Separate police forces maintained by some municipalities in South Africa

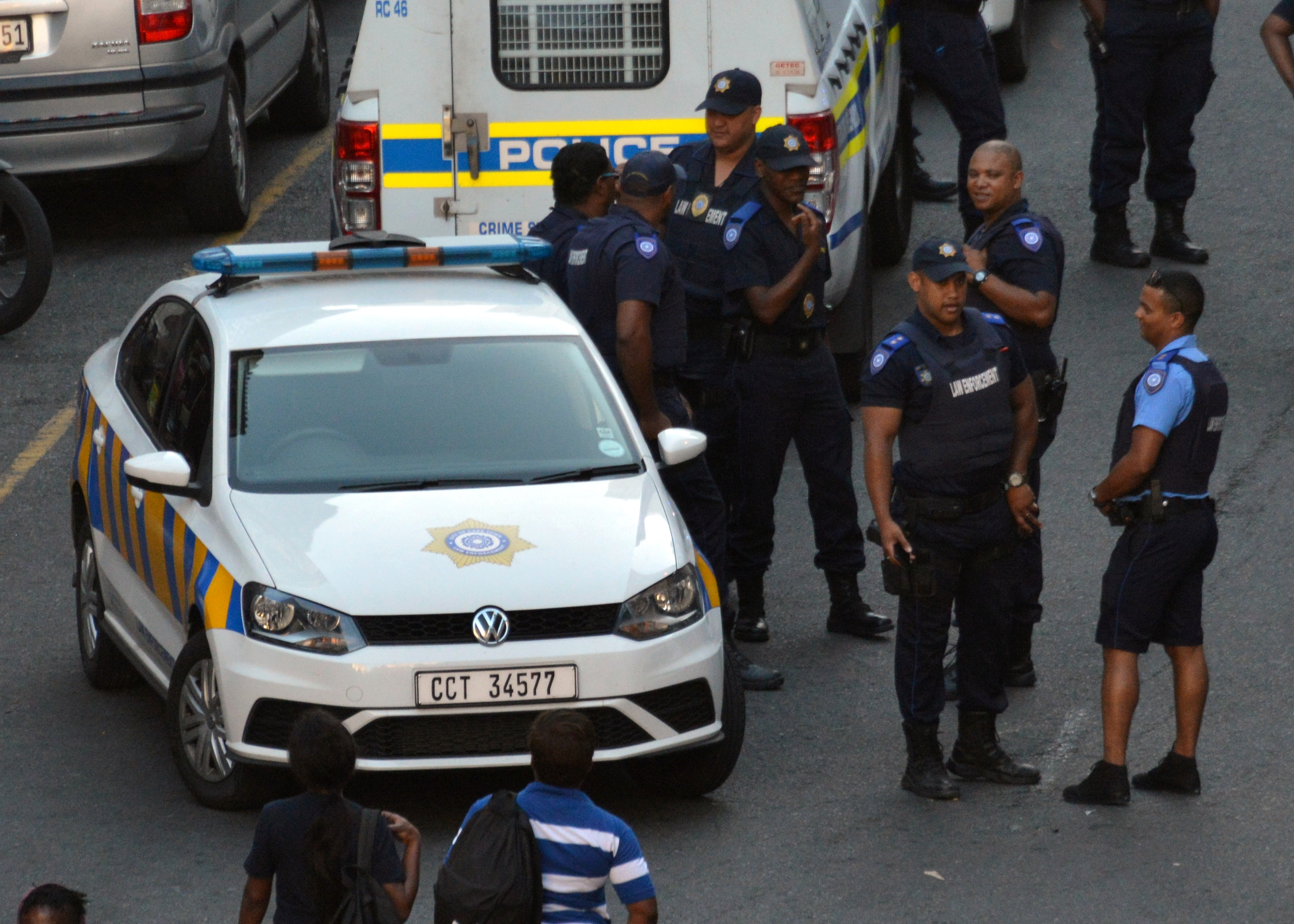
A group of Cape Town Municipal Law Enforcement personnel. These officers should not be confused with the Cape Town Metropolitan Police.

In South Africa, the Municipal Police (also called Metro Police) are the police forces maintained by some municipalities for law enforcement in South Africa. Municipal police forces are distinct from the South African Police Service (SAPS), however they work closely with SAPS to prevent crime and maintain public order.

Metro Police are responsible for traffic policing and enforcing local bylaws within their respective jurisdictions, operate using their own allocated budgets, and are managed by local authorities, such as, in the case of Cape Town, the Member of the Executive Council for Safety and Security. Metro Police also work closely with provincial police directorates.

Municipal police forces exist in most of the Metropolitan municipalities in South Africa, including the Buffalo City Metropolitan Municipality, City of Cape Town, City of Johannesburg, City of Tshwane, City of Ekurhuleni Metropolitan Municipality, eThekwini Metropolitan Municipality and Nelson Mandela Bay Metropolitan Municipality.

== History ==
Municipal policing in South Africa has a long history. The Cape Peninsula Urban Police were responsible for policing in and around the city of Cape Town between 1652 until its absorption into the national South African Police in 1913.

The Durban Borough Police created in 1854, later to become the Durban City Police, and now the Durban Metro Police, to police the city of Durban: the force was headed by a Chief Constable and was modelled on British police forces.

"Municipal police forces" were also established in some cities in the 1980s, during the apartheid era. According to the Truth and Reconciliation Commission, these forces were not highly regarded, and had a reputation for "high levels of excessive and inappropriate use of violence, often arising out of drunken behaviour, ill-discipline and personal vendettas".

== Metropolitan Police Departments ==
As of 2025 there were six metropolitan police departments in South Africa, one for each of country's major metro areas.

=== Cape Town Metropolitan Police ===
Uniquely, Cape Town has a its own a separate, dedicated City Traffic Department as well as a dedicated Law Enforcement Department.

The city's law enforcement department, the Cape Town Metropolitan Police Department, was re-established as a distinct police force from the national level South African Police Service by an act of the Western Cape Provincial Parliament on 2 November 2001, taking effect on 1 December 2001. It was established to support the operations of the national police service in addition to enforcing municipal by-laws.

By 2012, the force had a number of specialised units including a CCTV camera unit, a gang unit, a tactical unit, and a drugs unit. By 2019 the force had a total of 519 officers growing to almost 600 officers and 729 total staff by 2023. Over 700 officers were added in 2025.

=== Other Metropolitan Police Departments ===
- Ekurhuleni Metropolitan Police Department
- Durban Metropolitan Police
- Johannesburg Metropolitan Police
- Nelson Mandela Bay Metropolitan Police
- Tshwane Metropolitan Police Department

== Legal basis ==
Section 206 of the Constitution of South Africa provides:

National legislation must provide a framework for the establishment, powers, functions and control of municipal police services.

The procedure for establishing a municipal police service is laid down in the South African Police Service Amendment Act of 1998. This Act allows municipalities to apply to the government of the relevant province for permission to establish a municipal police service. The provincial MEC of Safety and Security may approve the application, after consultation with the National Commissioner of the South African Police Service, if:

- The application submitted by the municipality complies with the requirements laid down in the Act.
- The municipality has the resources at its disposal to provide for a MPS which complies with national policing standards on a 24-hour basis.
- The establishment of a MPS will not negatively affect traffic policing.
- Provision has been made for civilian supervision of the MPS.
- The MPS will contribute to effective policing in that part of the province.

== Jurisdiction and powers ==
The powers and responsibilities of South African municipal police are more restricted than those of the South African Police Service. The three statutory functions of municipal police services are:

- Traffic policing
- Enforcement of municipal bylaws and regulations
- Crime Prevention
- Crime Combating

Municipal police forces do not conduct criminal investigations. Any person arrested by the municipal police on suspicion of having committed a criminal offence must be handed over to a South African Police Service station as soon as possible.

The biggest and most visible role of municipal police forces is traffic control. In Johannesburg, the municipal police made headlines when they announced a hunt for a man who was using the social networking site Twitter to warn about police road blocks and speed traps, claiming that the man, known only as "PigSpotter", could be charged with obstructing justice.

== See also ==
- South African Police Service

== Gallery ==
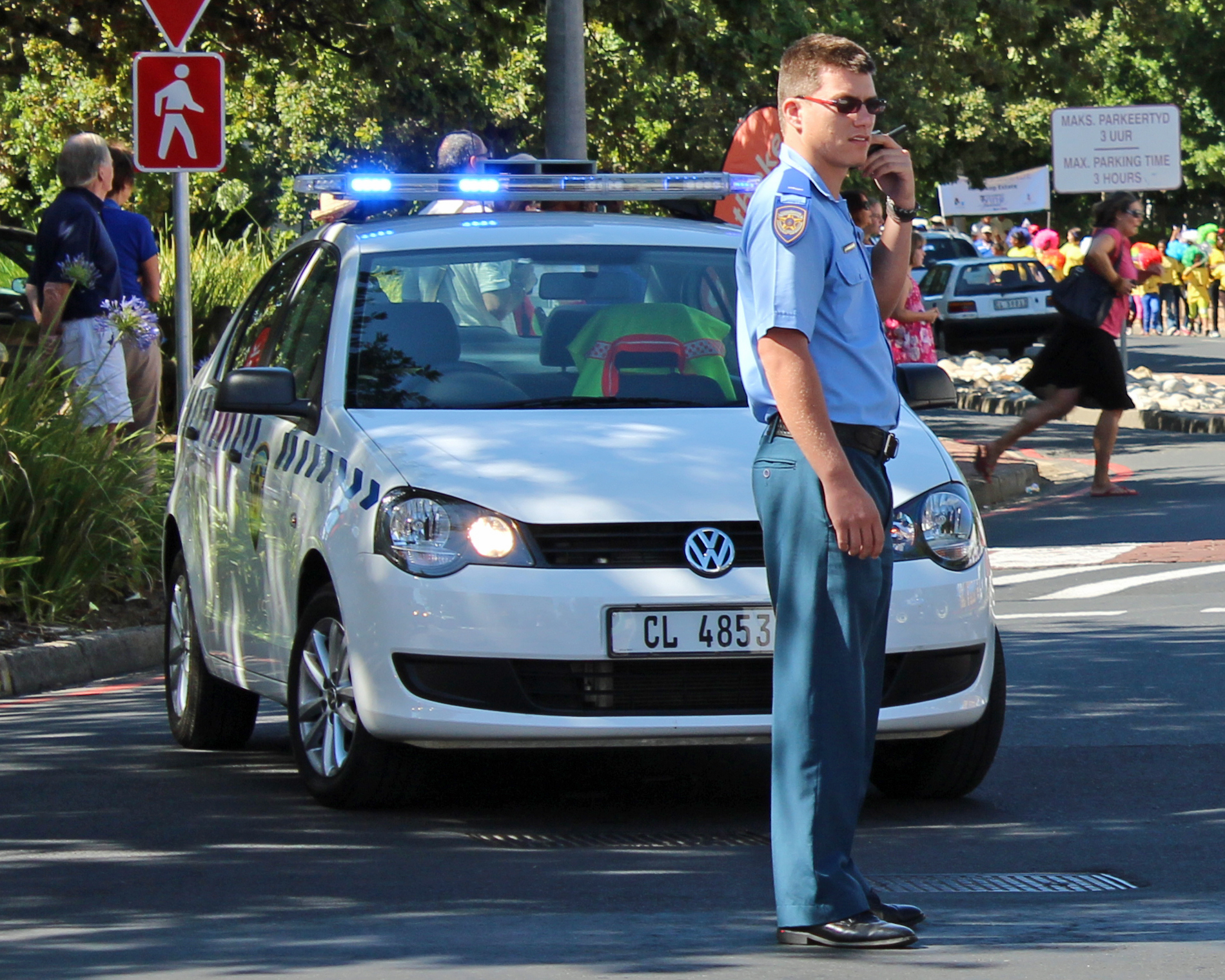
Stellenbosch Municipality traffic police officer

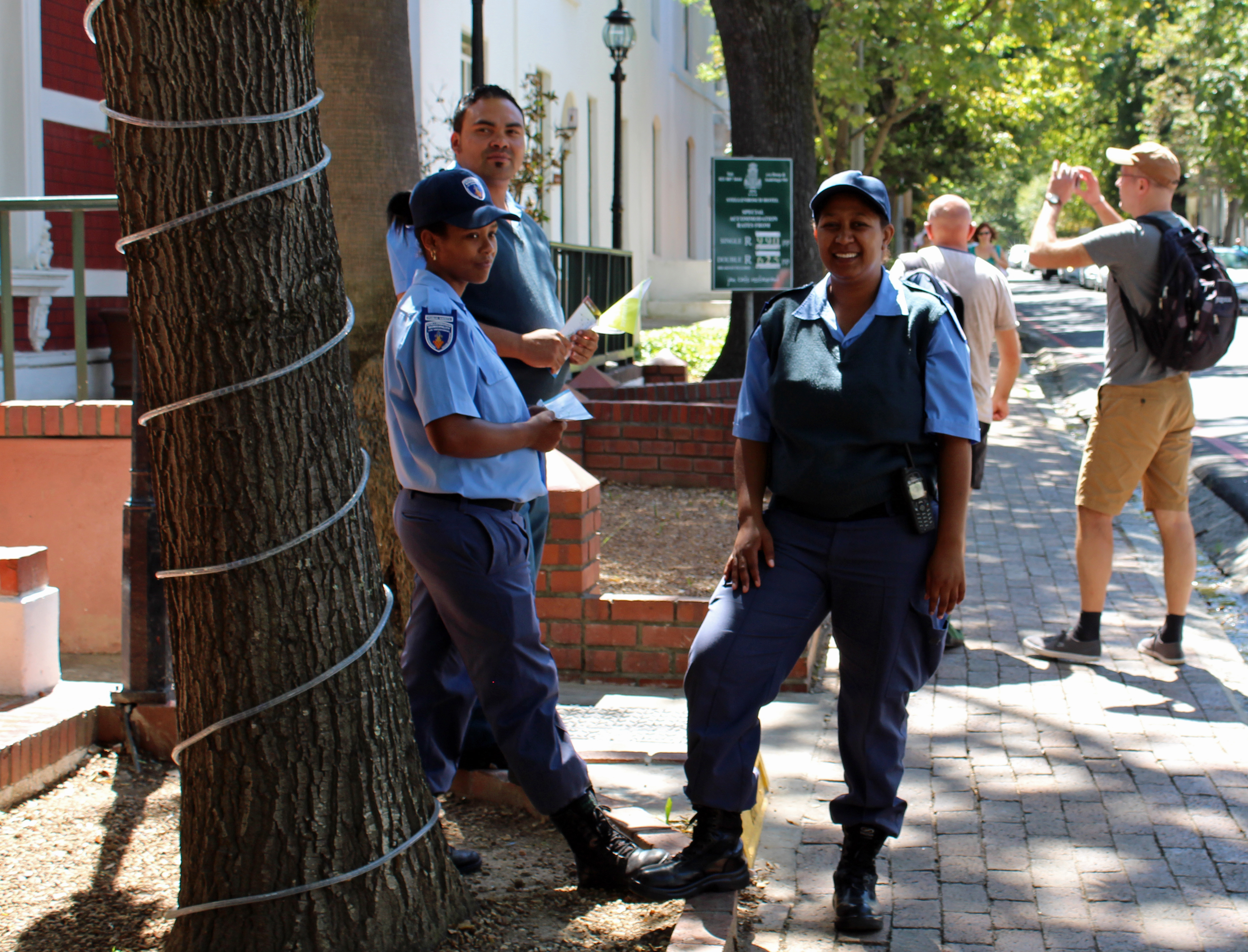
Stellenbosch Municipality law enforcement officers
