= Federico Aldrovandi =

Italian student killed by police brutality

Federico Aldrovandi (17 July 1987 in Ferrara – 25 September 2005 in Ferrara) was an Italian student, who was killed by four policemen.

== Events of September 25, 2005 ==
The event occurred nearby Viale Ippodromo in Ferrara. At night, Aldrovandi was walking when he was stopped by two policemen, Enzo Pontani and Luca Pollastri. The stop was due to reports of night-time disturbances. The Police in their Alfa 3 patrol car blocked his progress. Aldrovandi had used some illegal drugs that night.

The two policemen, claiming that they had been attacked without a reason, called for reinforcements. Two more officers, Paolo Forlani and Monica Segatto, arrived on patrol car Alfa 2. Together the four police officers handcuffed Aldrovandi, forced him against the ground. A violent assault followed. A combination of compression of Aldrovandi's chest and several blows led to the teen's demise.

Only after 5 hours, was the family informed of his death. He received over fifty injuries, bruises, lacerations on various part of his body. He is not believed to have died of shock.

The original official postulation was that Aldrovandi died from the drug consumption. After a long official silence and sidetracking, in November 2008 a photo uncovered by trial records showed that a cardiac hematoma in the region of Bundle of His was the likely contributor to his death. In addition, the compression of his chest while he was handcuffed and in prone position, led to asphyxia. Aldrovandi in addition had facial and cranial fractures.

The first trial ended on 6 July 2009, with the conviction of the four police officers; they were found guilty of excesses and of acting imprudently given their numerical advantage and the use truncheon blows against several parts of the victim's body, beating him to floor and subsequently compressing his thorax, causing him to suffocate.

The initial sentence was of 3 years and 6 months, but it was reduced due to the controversial pardon (indulto) issued in 2006 by the Italian Parliament, which subtracted 3 years of prison from all sentences. The guilty sentence was confirmed by Italian Supreme Court on 21 June 2012 (sentenza 36280). According to Supreme Court the condition of nervous excitement in which the boy had required a dialogue and restrained intervention but the four policemen dealt several blows at Aldrovandi indifferent to his call for help. It noted that Segatto dealt at his legs with truncheon, Pontani and Forlani crushed him to the ground, while Pollastri continued striking him. They exceeded lawfulness adopting an incautious and damaging conduct.

The local prosecutors were also suspected of trying to cover culpability of the officers. The first report from the coroner maintained that the boy died because of heart disease caused by the struggle; it was later proved to be false.

== Legacy ==
- As of February 13, 2014, the police officers have returned to their work. The family of Aldrovandi organized a protest in Ferrara for February 15, 2014, claiming that according to Police regulations, the officers should be expelled.
- On April 29, 2014 "a major police union in Italy has provoked outrage" after giving a five-minute standing ovation to three of the four officers convicted of the manslaughter of Federico.
- A documentary about his story has been released in 2010 with the title "Un ragazzo in stato di morte" ("A young man in a state of death", a pun about the responsibility of the state in the murder).
- In July 2019, shortly after Federico's birthday, family members made the decision to close the non-profit making Associazione Federico Aldrovandi stating that public protest had run its course. Friends, however, stated that the memory of Federico will not be lost and confided in a common struggle against police brutality together with other cases such as that of Stefano Cucchi.
- A flag bearing a portrait of Federico is waved by supporters at every match played by the local football team S.P.A.L., of which the young man was also a supporter.
