= Cape Mounted Police =

Cape Mounted Police (originally Cape Police) (1882–1913)
- Common name: Cape Mounted Police
- Abbreviation: CMP

Agency overview
- Formed: 1882
- Preceding agency: Various
- Dissolved: 1913
- Superseding agency: South African Army

Jurisdictional structure
- Operations jurisdiction: South Africa
- Legal jurisdiction: Cape of Good Hope
- General nature: Local civilian police

The Cape Mounted Police (originally Cape Police) was the principal law enforcement agency of the Cape Colony during its last three decades. In addition to its ordinary policing duties, it was a para-military organisation, which saw active service in several campaigns and operations, including the Anglo-Boer War (1899–1902). The force was fully militarised in 1913 and transferred to the new South African Army as a mounted rifle regiment.

== Background ==
The formation of the Cape Police followed a four-year period of warfare in southern Africa, which included the 9th Frontier War (1877–78), the Northern Border campaigns (1878–1879), the Morosi campaign in Basutoland (1879), the Basutoland Gun War (1880–1881) and the Transkei (a.k.a. 'Mpondomisi') Campaign (1880–1881).

At that time, policing in the Cape Colony was decentralised. Each district had a small "rural" police force, under direction of the resident magistrate. Cape Town had both town and water police. There were para-military mounted police forces in Griqualand West and the northern border districts.

The Scanlen ministry had the Police Regulation Act passed in 1882, to enable the government to establish police forces. The Act authorised it to declare "police districts" and establish police forces for them, to preserve the peace, prevent crime and apprehend offenders. These forces were "chiefly intended for the detection and investigation of crime and the arrest of offenders." However, in the case of any war or other emergency, the government could deploy them to assist with the defence of the colony, within or beyond its borders.

Although the Act did not give these police forces a specific name, they became known collectively as the "Cape Police". They were quite separate from the local forces directed by the magistrates.

== Cape Police: 1882–1904 ==
=== Original districts ===
Seven police districts were established in August and September 1882. Each was a self-contained organisation, headed by a commissioner.

District 1 was in Cape Town, and was largely an urban police force.

Five districts were in the eastern province, which bordered on Basutoland and the Transkeian territories, where some of the recent conflicts had taken place : District 2 (HQ : Grahamstown), District 3 (HQ : King William's Town), District 4 ( HQ : Fort Beaufort), District 5 (HQ : Queenstown) and District 6 (HQ : Wodehouse).

District 7 (HQ : Kimberley) covered the major urban area of the diamond-mining province of Griqualand West.

In March 1883, the rest of Griqualand West, which had hitherto had its own police force, became District 8 (HQ : Barkly West).

Finally, in June 1884, the northern border districts along the Orange River became District 9 (HQ : Upington). This replaced the Northern Border Police, which had been formed in 1880.

The Cape Police were mounted, except in Cape Town and Kimberley where they were generally foot police.

=== Reduction in districts ===
Financial stringency soon caused the government to economise by closing headquarters and combining districts. From September 1884, Districts 3 and 5 were jointly commanded by one commissioner, and from 1887 he was in command of District 6 as well. From February 1886, Districts 2 and 4 were both under one commissioner. District 1 was closed in 1888.

The five police districts were then renumbered :

- Districts 2 and 4 became District 1
- Districts 3, 5 and 6 became District 2
- District 7 became District 3
- District 8 became District 4
- District 9 became District 5.

In March 1891, Districts 3 and 4 were placed under a single commissioner. In 1892, the government combined Districts 1 and 2 and added more than a dozen eastern and midland magisterial districts to them to form a new District 1; and amalgamated Districts 3, 4 and 5 to form a new District 2. District 1's HQ were in Port Elizabeth and District 2's in Kimberley.

When British Bechuanaland was annexed to the colony in November 1895, it was added to District 2. 106 members of the Bechuanaland Border Police were transferred to the CP.

=== Duties ===
Law enforcement duties were many and varied. Annual reports, tabled in Parliament, show that cases of assault, breaches of the peace, contraventions of laws and regulations, drunkenness, loitering, public nuisances, theft, trespassing and vagrancy were routine. Some districts had to contend with stock theft, diamond theft and smuggling (especially in and around Kimberley), and contraventions of the law which prohibited "native foreigners", i.e. Black men from territories outside the colony, from entering the colony without an official pass.

From 1884, District 7, which bordered on the Orange Free State, had to act as customs officers. Districts 7 and 8 also had to deal with rioting mineworkers in 1884. In 1886, District 7 had to deal with election-related unrest. In 1887, District 7's headquarters staff survived two attempts to poison them with arsenic, presumably to undermine law enforcement in Kimberley.

=== Bechuanaland Campaign ===
British Bechuanaland was soon the scene of the CP's first military action. During the 1896–97 rinderpest epidemic, CP District 2 was ordered to ensure that infected livestock were killed. Batswana leaders resisted the order, leading to armed conflict and a lengthy standoff in the Langberg mountains. As the CP did not have the necessary resources, the government mobilised the defence force to end the resistance. Units of CP District 2 were attached to the military Bechuanaland Field Force for the eight-month-long operation.

=== Anglo-Boer War ===
The Anglo-Boer War followed barely two years later. The government mobilised the CP on the outbreak of war in October 1899, and placed them under military command. Both Districts 1 and 2 were in action throughout the war. Neither served as a unit, but was broken up into detachments which served with British and Cape military formations in many parts of the colony, and in the neighbouring Boer republics. Operations included the defence of Kimberley during the three-month-long siege (October 1899 to February 1900); the defence of Mafeking during the seven-month-long siege (October 1899 to May 1900); operations in and around the Calvinia district (December 1900 to January 1901); operations in the Transkei (July and August 1901); and the pursuit of General Smuts' commandos (September 1901 onwards).

The CP were also responsible for guarding prisoners of war.

Nine members were decorated for war service, and many were mentioned in despatches. Sgt Maj Alexander Young was awarded the Victoria Cross (August 1901).

District 2 launched a monthly journal, The Bandolier, in October 1900.

The CP re-established a presence in Cape Town towards the end of 1901. It opened a training depot at Maitland, and the whole of the Cape Peninsula became District 3 shortly afterwards. In 1902, part of District 2 was added to District 3.

From 1902, District 2 used camels for patrolling the Kalahari region of its district.

== Cape Mounted Police: 1904–1913 ==
=== Consolidation ===
After the war, the government consolidated the three districts into a single police force. Lt Col Macleod Robinson, who was already commissioner of Districts 2 and 3, was given command of District 1 too. On 1 April 1904, the three districts were amalgamated under Robinson's command, and the CP was renamed Cape Mounted Police.

At the same time, the government established an 'Urban Police District', comprising the urban police elements in the Cape Peninsula, Grahamstown, Kimberley, and other towns. District Inspector Robert Crawford was appointed commissioner. As this fragmented district proved unsatisfactory, most of the towns concerned were transferred to the CMP, and Cape Town and Kimberley each became an UPD in its own right. Crawford was commissioner of the Cape Peninsula UPD and, from 1909, of the CMP too.

=== Herero Wars ===
During the Herero Wars (1904–08), the CMP had to deploy additional men to guard the border with German South-West Africa, to control the influx of refugees, and to stop gun-running from the Cape to the warring parties.

=== Ferreira Raid ===
In November 1906, an armed gang led by the Ferreira brothers entered the northern Cape from German South West Africa, with the object of stirring up anti-British rebellion. The gang attacked a CMP outpost at Abeam, killing a policeman. With the support of the Cape Mounted Riflemen, the CMP captured the gang.

=== Morenga expedition ===
In September 1907, at the request of the government of German South West Africa, the CMP tracked down the Herero resistance leader Jacob Morenga, who had escaped to the Cape Colony and taken refuge in the Kalahari. A CMP detachment under Major Heathfield Eliott, cornered Morenga near Witpan, and killed him in the ensuing shootout. Eliott was awarded the Distinguished Service Order and a German order, and the South West African government gave the CMP men a campaign medal for the operation.

=== Final years ===
When the Cape Colony was incorporated into the new Union of South Africa in May 1910, the CMP and the UPDs were placed under the control of the new national ministry of justice.

The Permanent Force and the South African Police were established on 1 April 1913. The CMP were fully militarised and transferred to the Permanent Force as the '5th South African Mounted Riflemen', while the UPDs were transferred to the South African Police. The 5th SAMR was disbanded in April 1920 and its members were transferred to the SA Police.

== See also ==
- Criminal investigation
- List of law enforcement agencies in South Africa
- List of mounted police units
- Mounted police
- South African Army
- South African Police
- South African Police Service
