= Militarization of police =

Law enforcement using combat methods

Seattle Police Department officers at the George Floyd protests, 2020

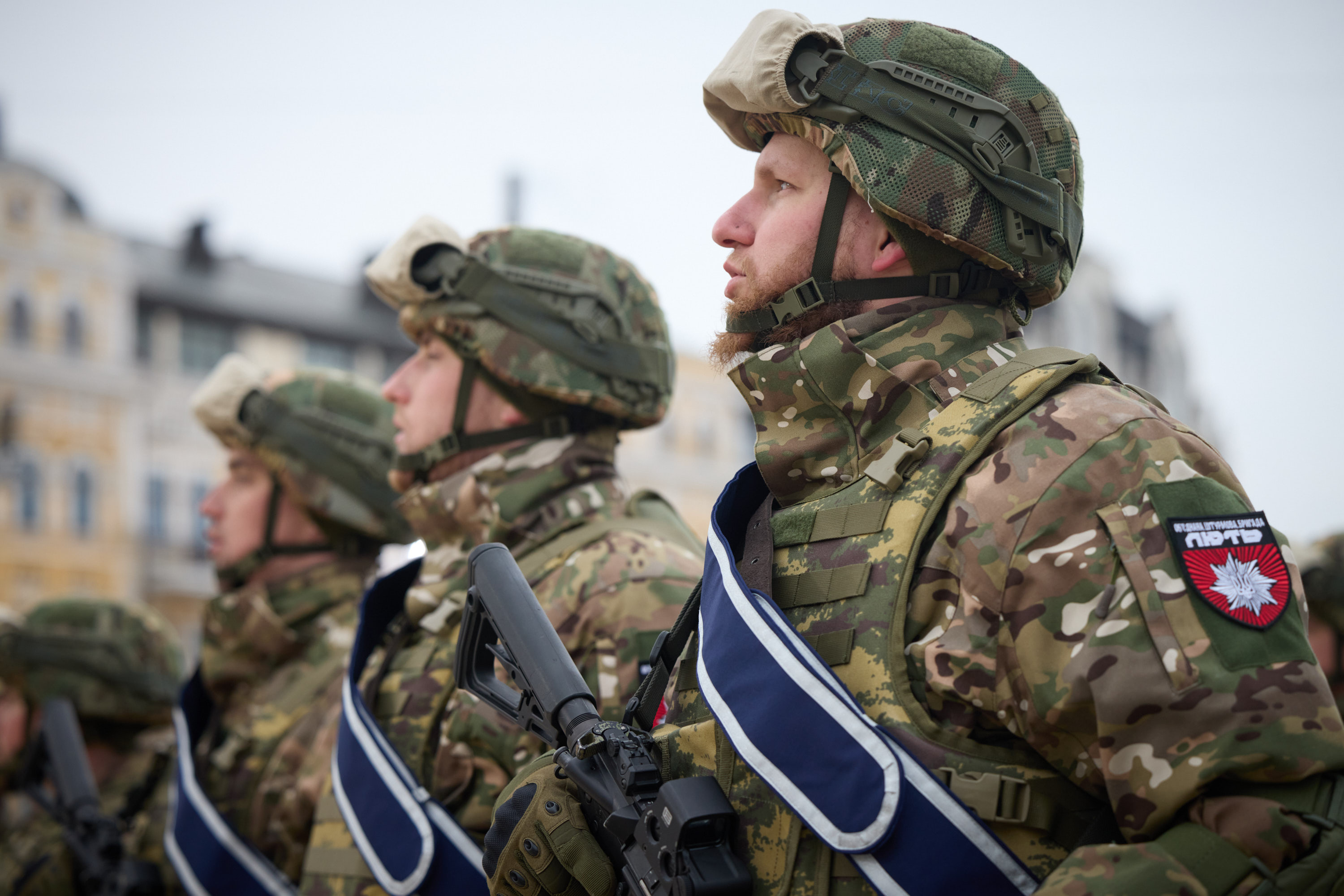
Liut Brigade members of the National Police of Ukraine in 2023, part of the Offensive Guard.

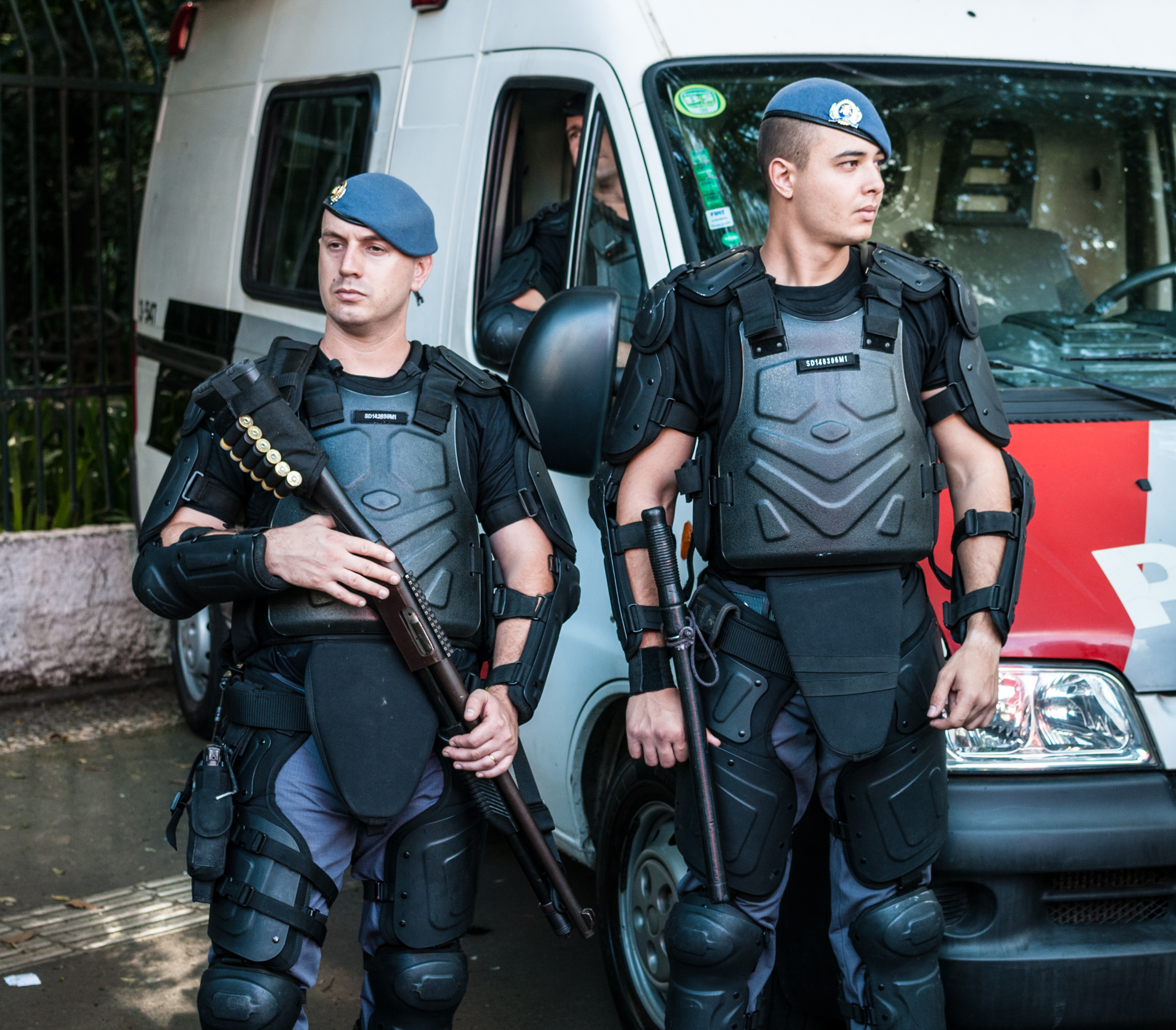
Military Police of São Paulo State officers in riot gear, 2016.

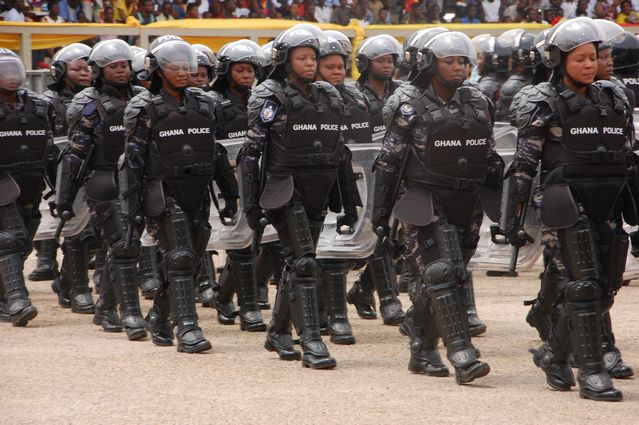
All-women riot police unit of the Ghana Police Service at the country's 59th Independence Day parade, 2016.

The militarization of police (sometimes referred to as the paramilitarization of police in media) is the use of military equipment and tactics by law enforcement officers. This includes the use of armored personnel carriers (APCs), assault rifles, submachine guns, flashbang grenades, sniper rifles, and SWAT (special weapons and tactics) teams. The militarization of law enforcement is also associated with intelligence agency–style information gathering aimed at the public and political activists and with a more aggressive style of law enforcement. Criminal justice professor Peter Kraska has defined the militarization of police as "the process whereby civilian police increasingly draw from, and pattern themselves around, the tenets of militarism and the military model."

Observers have noted the militarization of the policing of protests during the 21st century. Since the 1970s, riot police have fired at protesters using guns with rubber bullets or plastic bullets. Tear gas, which was developed by the United States Army for riot control in 1919, is still widely used against protesters. The use of tear gas in warfare is prohibited by various international treaties that most states have signed; however, its law enforcement or military use for domestic or non-combat situations is permitted.

Concerns about the militarization of police have been raised by both ends of the political spectrum in the United States, with both the libertarian Cato Institute and the American Civil Liberties Union (ACLU) voicing criticisms of the practice. The Fraternal Order of Police has spoken out in favor of equipping law enforcement officers with military equipment, claiming that it increases officers' safety and enables them to protect members of the public and other first responders (e.g., firefighters and emergency medical services personnel). However, a 2017 study showed that police forces that received military equipment were more likely to have violent encounters with the public, regardless of local crime rates. A 2018 study found that militarized police units in the United States were more frequently deployed to communities with large shares of African Americans, even after controlling for local crime rates.

Many countries also have at least one gendarmerie, which is a military force with law enforcement duties among the civilian population.

France classifies some weapons as "intermediate force weapons," such as its LBD 40 refitted version of the Swiss B&T GL06 military grenade launcher, which is used in riot control situations or against individuals in more specific interventions.

While not having the full power of military guns, some weapons are heavier than regular police weaponry and are still lethal. These are often referred to by the "limited lethality" appellation.

== Brazil ==
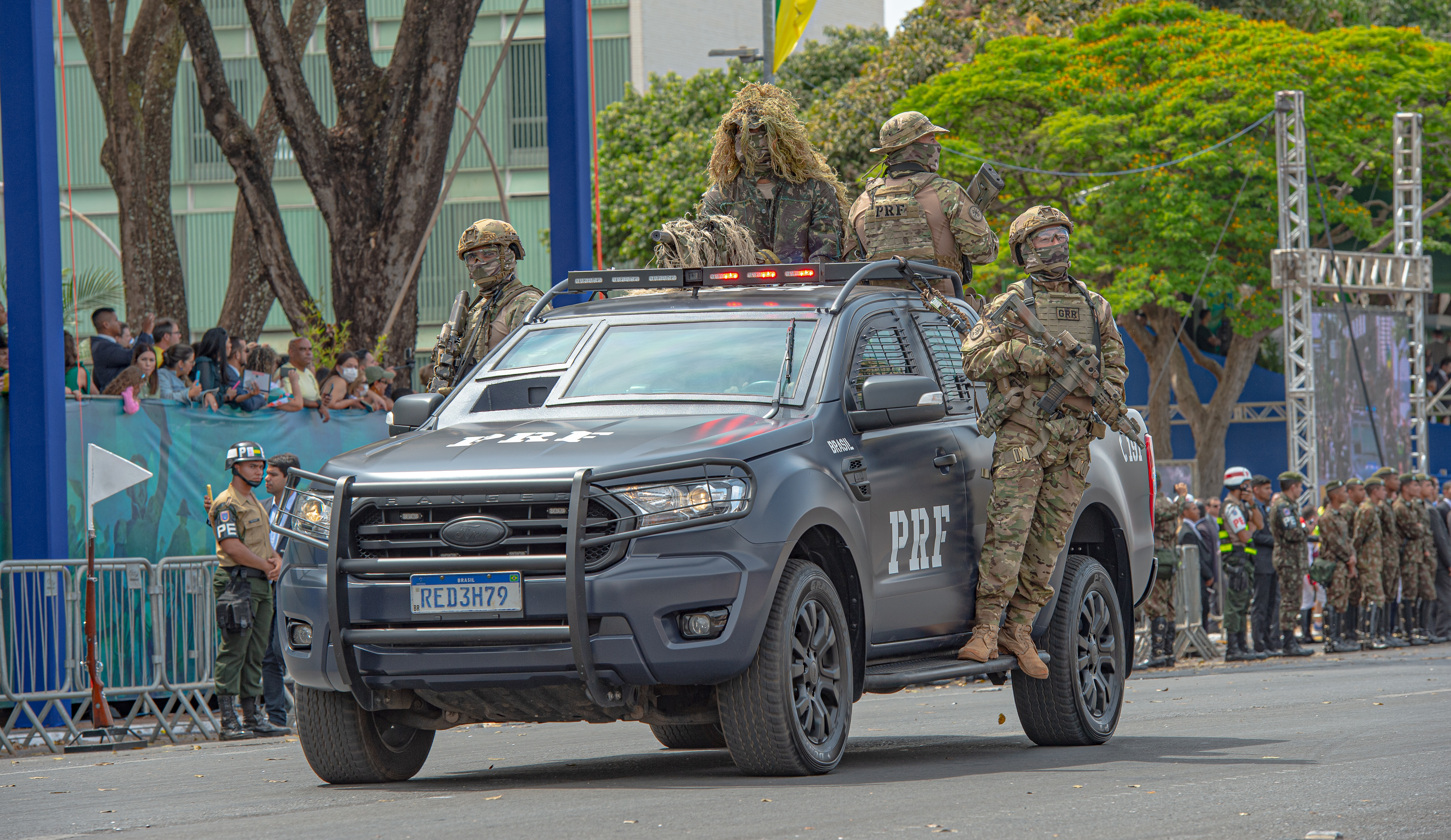
A Brazilian Federal Highway Police tactical team in the 2022 Independence Day parade

In 2013 "... Brazil saw countrywide demonstrations protesting a lack of basic services while the country was spending billions on the World Cup and the Olympics. The unprepared and overreacting police forces responded in a way that shocked the largely middle-class protesters. The police, using 'non-lethal' weapons like pepper spray and rubber bullets while dressed from head to toe in ninja-like full battle gear, indiscriminately arrested both violent 'black bloc' demonstrators, known for their confrontational tactics and anarchist views, along with non-violent protestors marching peacefully." As a result, "... calls for de-militarization of the police—from social movements, non-governmental organizations, and even segments of the police itself—became widespread and remain one of the legacies of the World Cup". The Brazilian "... Military Police today, while not officially a wing of the Armed Forces, remains an institution with a strict military hierarchy, training that retains a military ideology, and practices that frequently resemble occupying forces conquering enemy territories".

The units that responded to the protests were Shock Police, units specializing in riot control. The Military Police is an ancillary and reserve force of the Army, under the General Inspectorate of Military Police, being that a part of Land Operations Command. But, in time of peace, the state governor act as commander-in-chief of the Police and Firefighting Corps, according to the Constitution of Brazil, where it is said that the "Military Police and Firefighter Corps, ancillary and reserve forces of the Army, subordinate themselves, with the Civil Police, to the state and Federal District governors."

The Brazilian Federal Highway Police (PRF) was also criticized for the creation of tactical teams during the Bolsonaro administration, during a process that was seen by some as a politically charged militarization of the force. During this period, PRF tactical teams gained notoriety after taking part in two high-profile operations. The first one, which sought to apprehend criminals responsible for planning a series of high-profile bank robberies across the country known as the Novo Cangaço (New Cangaço), left 26 suspects dead after a raid in Varginha in October 2021. The second one, a joint incursion with BOPE in the Vila Cruzeiro favela of Rio de Janeiro, left 23 dead, including a civilian bystander. Minister of Justice Flávio Dino of the Lula administration that followed sought to restructure the organization, mentioning the 2022 election controversy and claiming that it had "deviated" from its main role, requiring a "depoliticization".

== Canada ==
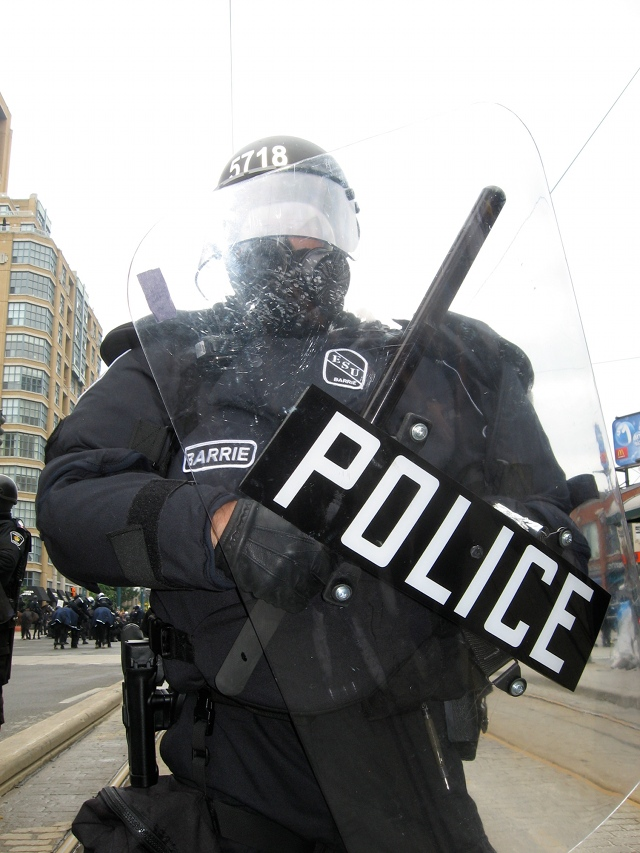
A Barrie Police officer in full riot gear at the 2010 G20 Toronto summit protests

Canadian legal expert Michael Spratt wrote, "... there's no question that Canadian police sometimes look more like post-apocalyptic military mercenaries than protectors of the peace. Our police services have been acquiring more and more military toys—a dangerous trend that's gotten little in the way of critical analysis in the mainstream media." Growing numbers of Canadian police agencies have acquired armored vehicles in recent years. In 2010, the Ottawa Police Service bought a Lenco G3 BearCat APC, an armored police vehicle.

The G20 protests in Toronto in 2010 showed that the militarization of protest policing is not only occurring in the United States. Police in Toronto used a sound cannon, or Long Range Acoustic Device (LRAD)—a weapon that was developed for use in conflicts in the Middle East, as well as barricades, pre-emptive arrests and riot units.^{[used for what?]} According to Kevin Walby, an assistant professor of criminal justice at the University of Winnipeg, "the more interesting aspect of the militarization of the police is actually on the strategy side"; police are "increasingly training with military-style tacticians, especially when it comes to situations like crowd control and, increasingly, surveillance".

On June 3, 2015, it was reported that "RCMP officers have started openly carrying MP5 submachine guns on Parliament Hill as part of a visible increase to Parliament Hill security following last October's terrorist attack" in 2014. Conservative senator Vern White, a former RCMP officer and a former Ottawa police chief, says "... some RCMP officers guarding Parliament Hill against potential terrorist attacks should be armed with rifles similar to those carried by Canadian troops in Afghanistan [,]" the "... more powerful Colt C8 [which is] popular with police tactical teams and Canadian and other NATO alliance troops". White argues that the C8 carbines would give officers a much longer shooting range than the short-barreled MP5 submachine guns. "The RCMP is issuing more than 2,200 C8 carbines to its officers", but the RCMP has not indicated whether the C8s will be issued to Parliament Hill officers.

The use of surplus armored vehicles for use by the RCMP and other police forces throughout the country are challenged by lawyers and academics since they can easily send the wrong message to the public. According to Michael Spratt, an Ottawa-based criminal lawyer, the funds used to acquire the vehicles is better used for crime prevention activities.

== Colombia ==
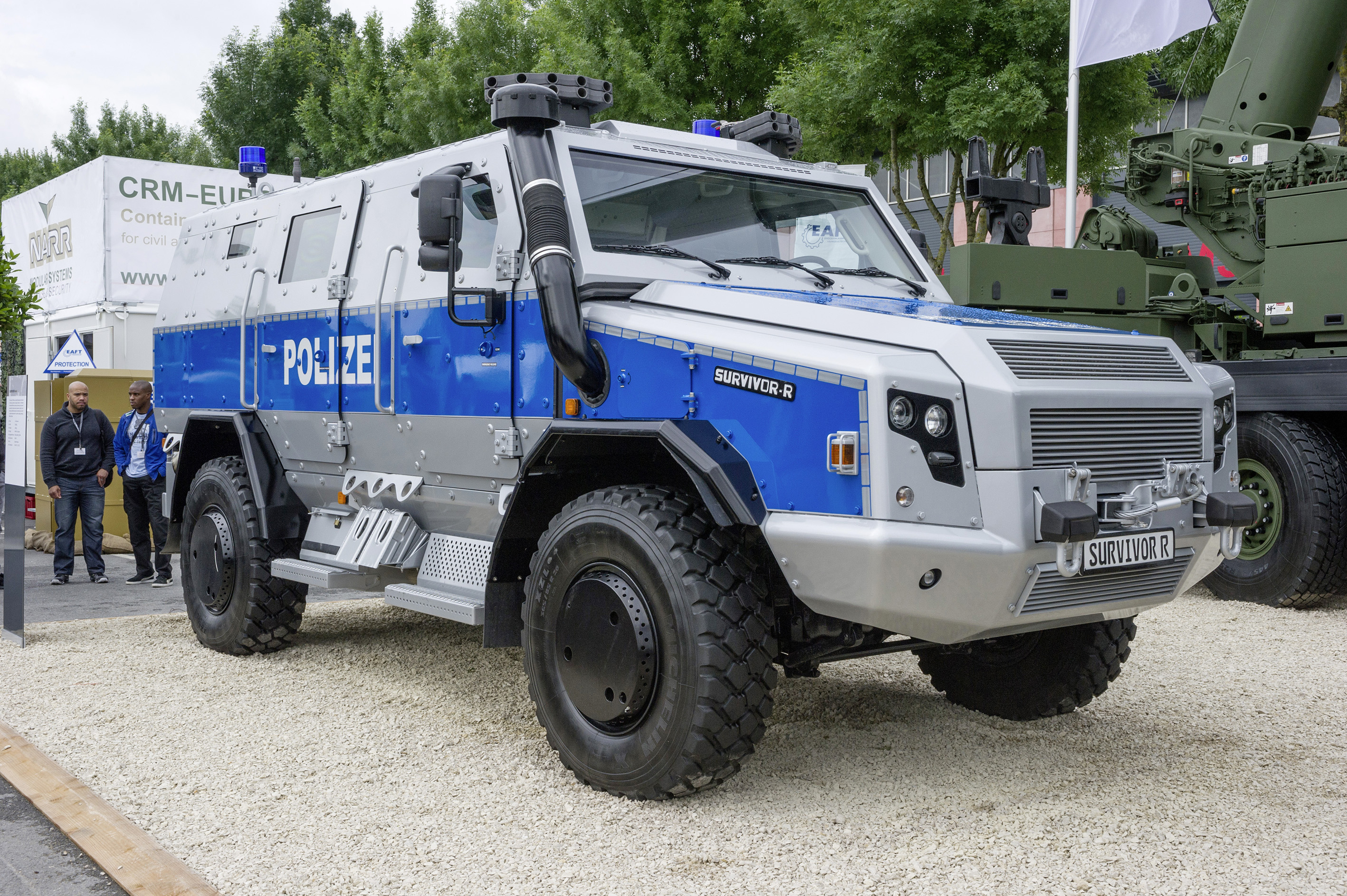
A Survivor R in blue-silver varnish for the German NRW Police as displayed at Eurosatory 2016

"Since 1999, an eight-billion-dollar programme in Colombia has seen the mass deployment of military troops and militarized police forces to both interdict illegal drugs and counter left-wing guerrilla groups". This assistance "promote[s] militarization to address organized crime". Due to these U.S. policies, "civilian forces ... have increasingly received military training, leading to concerns over human rights violations and excessive use of force, as well as a lack of knowledge over how to deal with local protests...".

== France ==
French police since the Charlie Hebdo shootings started to issue heavier guns to police instead of the standard SIG Sauer SP 2022 pistol issued per default. Before this heavier guns were only given to elite units but some units are now getting heavier weaponry such as the anti-criminality brigades which was given H&K G36 assault rifles. 18 of the 19 shootings with this weapon were accidental discharges, the first year when this weapon was issued to anti-criminality police officers.

Companies Republicaines de Sécurité which are an anti-riot unit are issued grenades which are classified as war weaponry in France. While gas weapons are forbidden for military use by the Geneva convention, which is signed by France too, no restriction applies to civilian use.

In 2021, basing himself on the model of the Gendarmerie France's Interior's Minister Gérald Darmanin said he wished to extend the police reserve of 30 000 reservists (against the 5000 men reserve) to "recreate links" with police forces. This comes during the protests against the Loi Sécurité Globale.

== Germany ==
In 2016, the German police introduced a new special unit, BFE+, which is designed to "counter terror attacks". Criminologist Rafael Behr says the new BFE+ "mainly serves as a psychological reassurance for the public", serving as a "symbolic" effort and a functional effort.

The functional aspect is that with the BFE+, the government can use armed forces with military weapons inside Germany, an act that is "currently banned by the German constitution". The 250 person BFE+ will be added to the existing GSG-9 unit. Behr states that the BFE+ will be able to "launch large-scale manhunts", using an "end of the policing spectrum" which "borders on war-like or military action".

== Hong Kong ==
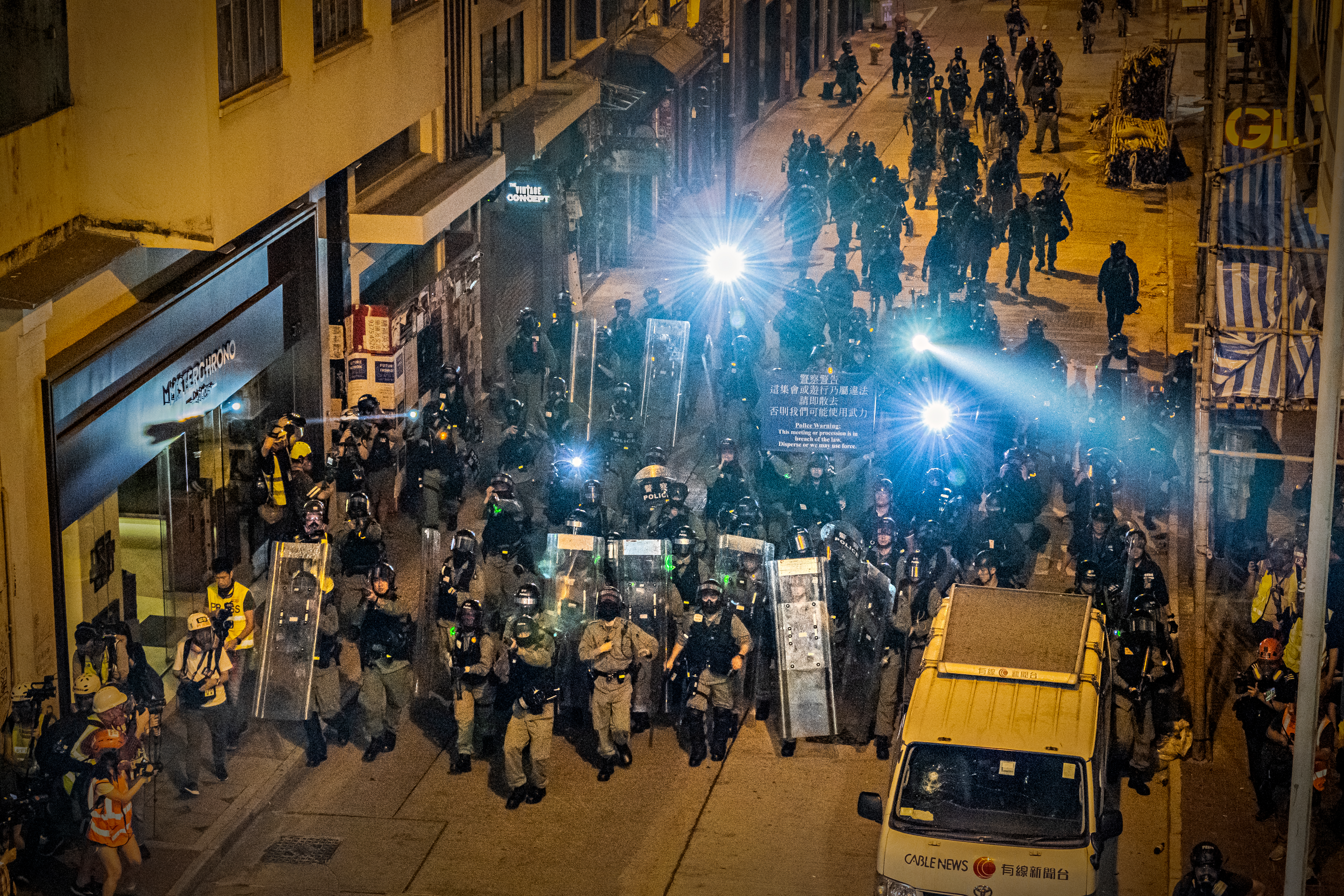
Riot police who were accused of obstructing reporters from taking photographs by shining flashlights at them during the Hong Kong protests, 2019

== Indonesia ==
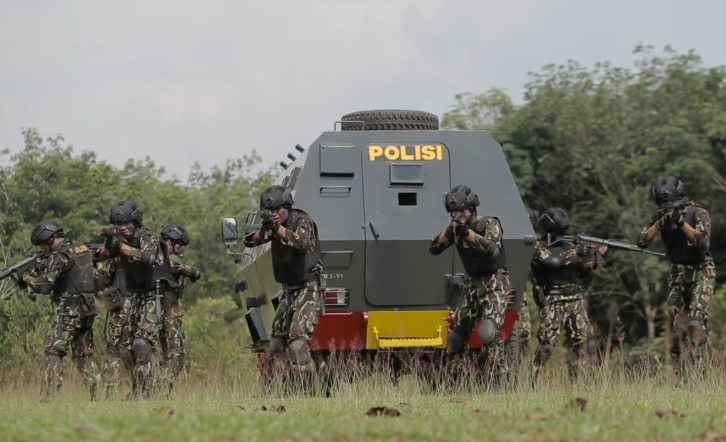
Brimob troops of the Indonesian National Police

The Mobile Brigade Corps (Brimob) is an Indonesian militarized police force (paramilitary) which are often deployed for riot control, SWAT operations, anti-terror, domestic guerrilla warfare, domestic civil hostage rescue, search and rescue, and armed conflict management especially in areas with domestic conflict, such as in Papua and Poso. It usually conducts joint operations with the Indonesian Army.

== Italy ==
Italy has a well-established tradition of police forces framed in military structures.

Even today, at least two of the national police forces, the Carabinieri and the Guardia di Finanza, are an integral part of the Italian Armed Forces. The Corpo delle Capitanerie di porto is a branch of the Marina Militare, and the Corpo forestale dello Stato, after its dissolution (2016), was mostly incorporated into the Carabinieri "forestali".

The Polizia di Stato has been demilitarized since 1981 and the Polizia Penitenziaria since 1990. However, both corps make extensive use of military equipment, especially in the area of weapons. The Reparti mobili della Polizia di Stato (informally dubbed la Celere) are logistically and organizationally similar to a military battalion; often their personnel operate jointly with personnel from Carabinieri battaglioni/reggimenti. The Prison Police has its own specialized department (Gruppo Operativo Mobile), which deals, among other things, with "facing critical situations in the prison environment."

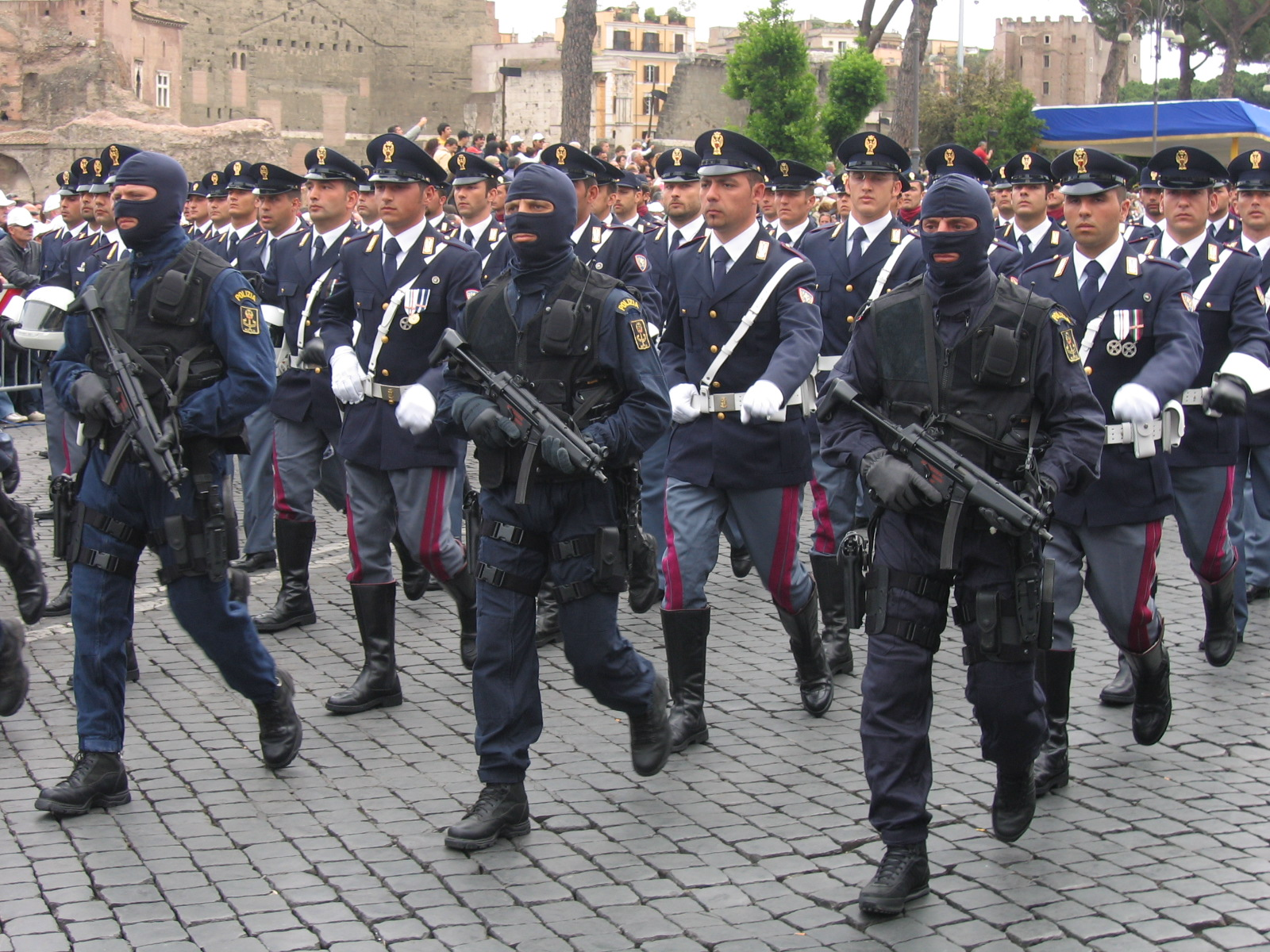
Despite its 1981 demilitarization, the Polizia di Stato has retained some of its military character.

During the Years of Lead, to deal with high-risk operational situations and also, specifically, as a result of the unsuccessful German response to the Munich massacre, NOCS (State Police) and GIS (Arma dei Carabinieri) were established, comparable to SWAT units from other countries.

Since 2008, thousands of members of the armed forces (mainly Italian Army) have been engaged in Operazione Strade sicure, basically to replace/assist law enforcement agencies in policing tasks (prevention/deterrence).

The November 2015 Paris attacks had shown that normal police patrols could be ineffective against sudden terrorist attacks with military-grade weapons (nor, moreover, was it realistic to assume that the elite units described above could always be present in places that required an exceptional state response). Precisely to engage such attackers—enabling GIS or NOCS to intervene decisively, while limiting the risks to public safety—"intermediate tactical formations" Unità operative di primo intervento of the State Police, and Aliquote di primo intervento—Squadre operative di supporto of the Carabinieri were created.

== Mexico ==
Mexico's national police force, the National Guard, is partially staffed with active duty soldiers, part of a longstanding trend towards militarization of the country's Federal Police.

According to a 2020 study, the use of torture by police has persisted in Mexico even though Mexico transitioned to democracy. Torture is still used due to "weak procedural protections and the militarization of policing, which introduces strategies, equipment, and mentality that treats criminal suspects as though they were enemies in wartime".

== Russia ==
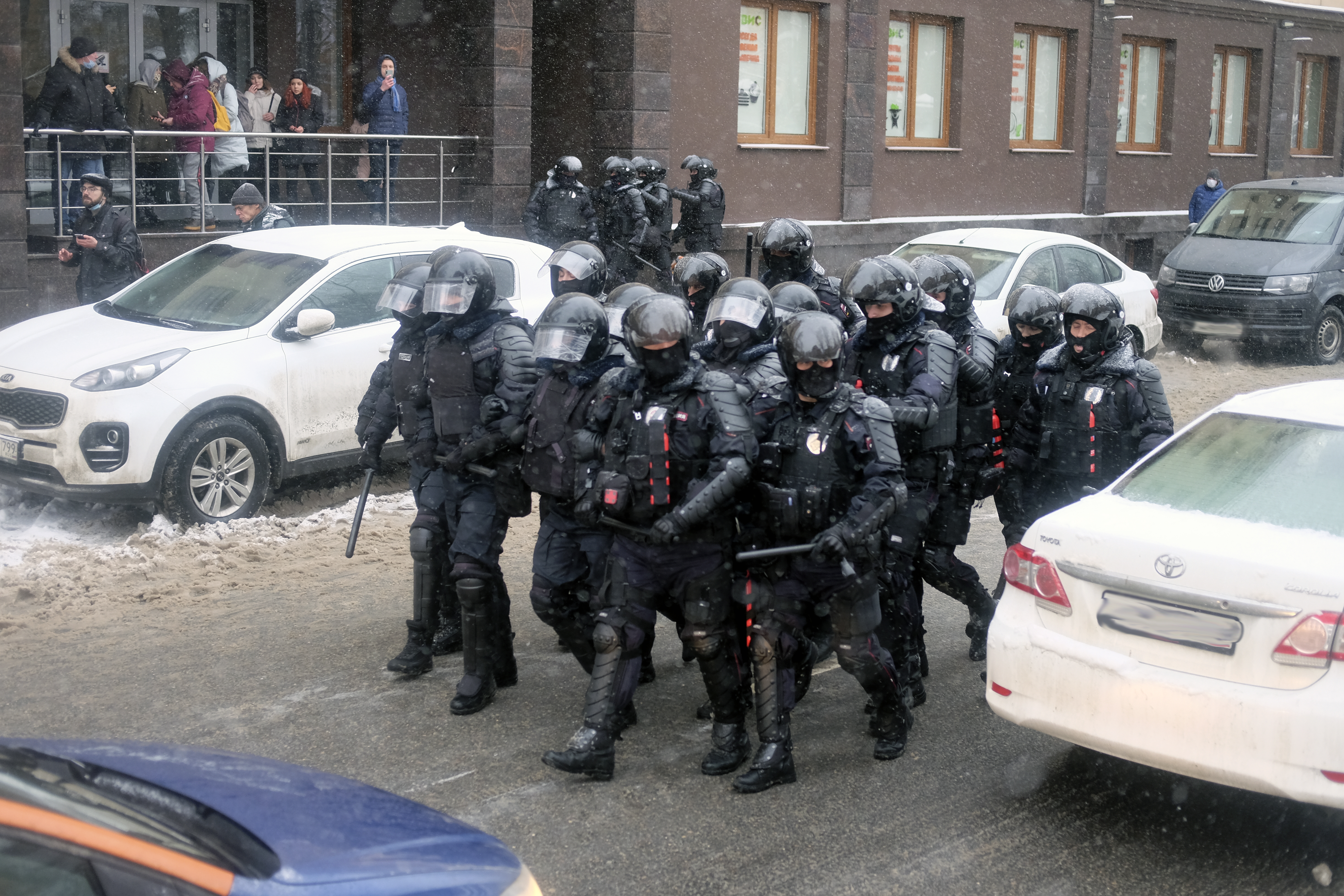
Riot police marching in Matrosskaya Tishina, Moscow

== United Kingdom ==
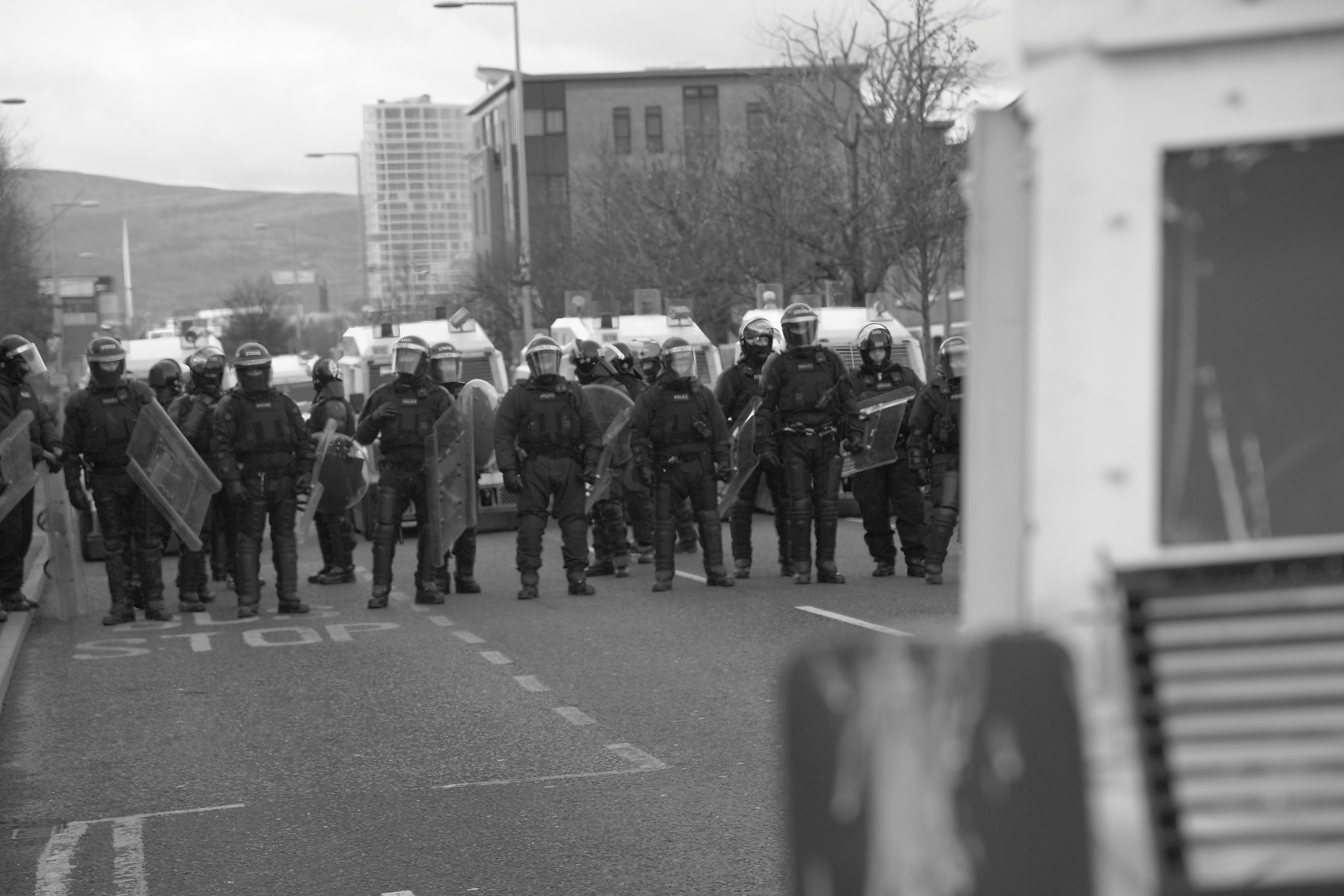
PSNI march in unison, following the trail of loyalists flooding back into East Belfast

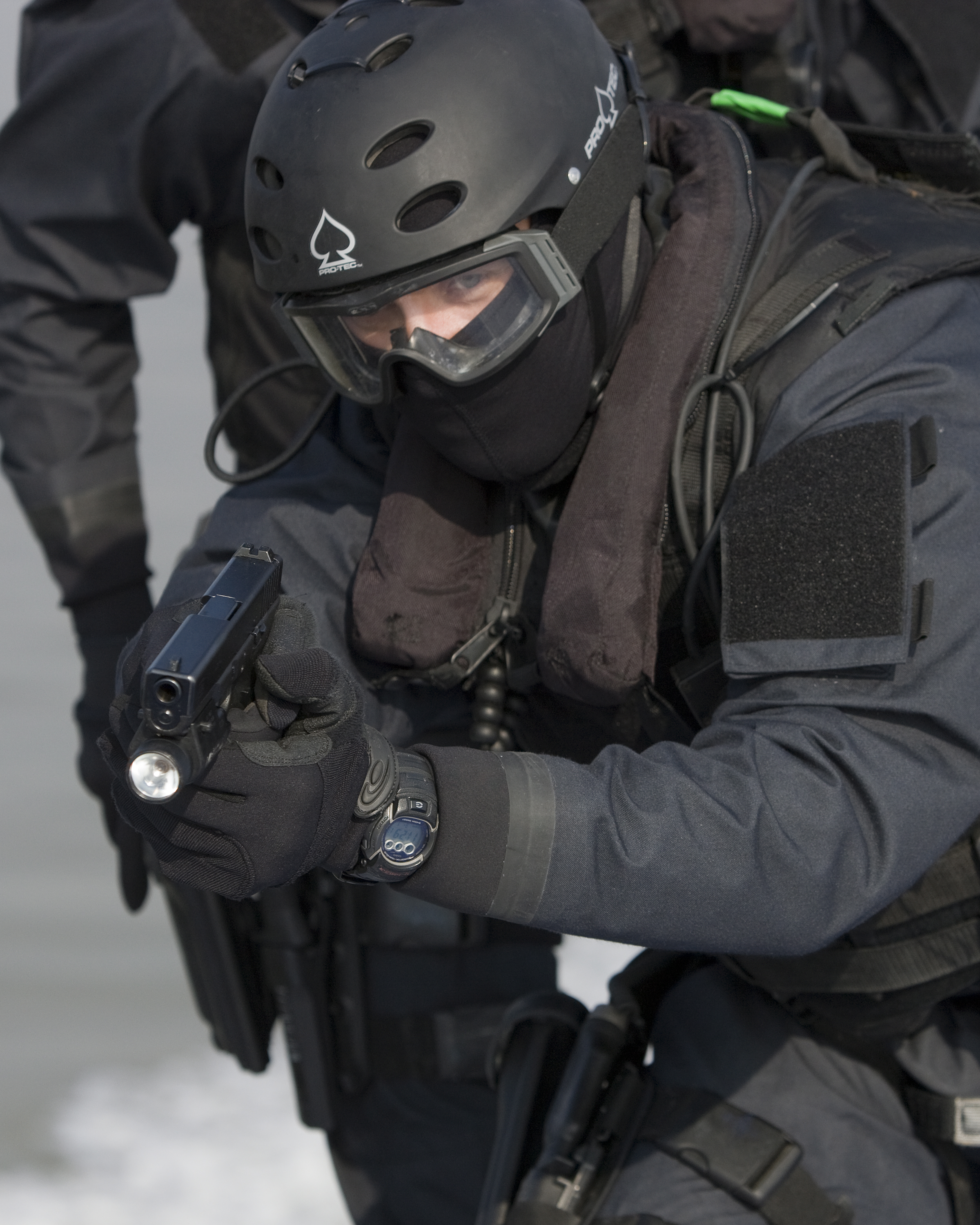
CTSFO boarding team during an Olympics security exercise

The Royal Irish Constabulary (RIC) was the police force in Ireland from 1822 until 1922, when the country was part of the United Kingdom of Great Britain and Ireland. This was a time of agrarian unrest and Irish nationalist/republican agitation. The RIC was a quasi-military police force: constables were armed with rifles, billeted in barracks, and the force had a militaristic structure and uniform. During the Irish War of Independence, it was tasked with tackling the Irish Republican Army (IRA) and worked alongside the British Army. An Auxiliary Division and Ulster Special Constabulary were formed to carry out counter-guerrilla operations.

The RIC became the Royal Ulster Constabulary (RUC) in Northern Ireland, which remained part of the UK. It remained a militarized police force due to the threat of IRA attacks. During the Northern Ireland conflict (1960s–1990s), the RUC routinely carried submachine guns and assault rifles, traveled in armored Land Rovers, were based in heavily fortified police stations and worked alongside the British Army, sometimes mounting joint patrols and sharing the same bases. The RUC was the first police force to use rubber and plastic bullets for riot control. The "political and militarised" RUC was succeeded by the Police Service of Northern Ireland, which continues to keep some counter-terrorism powers. Since the 2000s, its public order policing methods have been adopted by other police forces in the UK.

=== Counter Terrorist Specialist Firearms Officer ===
Following the 2012 London Summer Olympics, the Metropolitan Police Service established a new firearms officer role. This role was known as the Counter Terrorist Specialist Firearms Officer (CTSFO). Prior to this establishment the highest Authorised Firearms Officer standard was the Specialist Firearms Officer. This new CTSFO role gained new equipment such as night vision goggles, armoured Ford Jankel Guardians, BMW F800GS motorcycles and brand new SIG MCX rifles. They also received training which was assisted by the Special Air Service such as fast roping from helicopters, abseiling, live fire CQB exercises and methods of explosive entry for door breaching. CTSFOs also have maritime capabilities from the Marine Policing Unit which allows them to raid vessels. This means that they can deploy from sea, air and land. Aspiring CTSFOs must complete a long gruelling selection course before achieving the role. When becoming a CTSFO they are established into teams to form a police tactical unit.

On 3 August 2016, the MPS held a press conference for the announcement of Operation Hercules, displaying the CTSFO teams to the public wearing wolf-grey-coloured tactical uniforms, equipped with SIG Sauer SIG516 and SIG MCX carbines, Glock 17 handguns, Remington 870 shotguns, Accuracy International AT308 sniper rifles, and paraded the BMW F800GS motorcycles used for deployments in Central London.

== United States ==
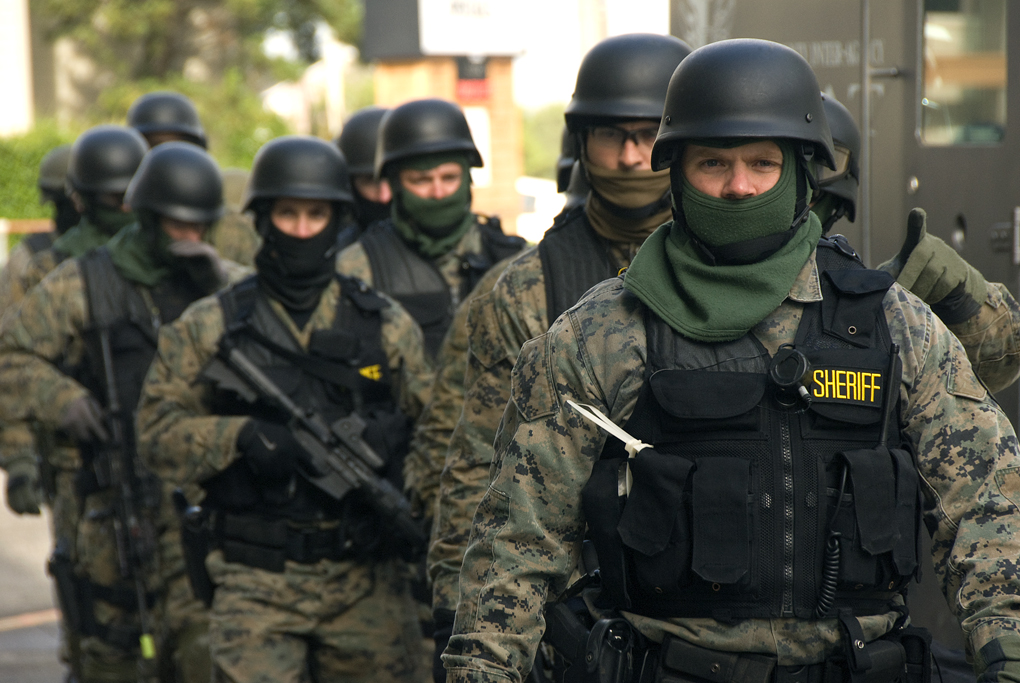
Special Weapons and Tactics (SWAT) team members, some armed with assault rifles, preparing for an exercise, 2009.

Professional police departments have changed over time in the United States. The first professionalized police departments in the United States were modeled on the London Metropolitan Police. In 1844, the first civil police force in the United States was created in New York City. They were under civilian control and were non-militaristic in the sense that they eschewed military uniforms, weaponry and training. According to Julian Go of the University of Chicago, police departments in the United States became increasingly militarized in the early 20th century as they "borrowed tactics, techniques, and organizational templates from America's imperial-military regime that had been developed to conquer and rule foreign populations". Historian Stuart Schrader has linked the experiences of World War II to later militarization of police in the United States.

=== 20th century ===
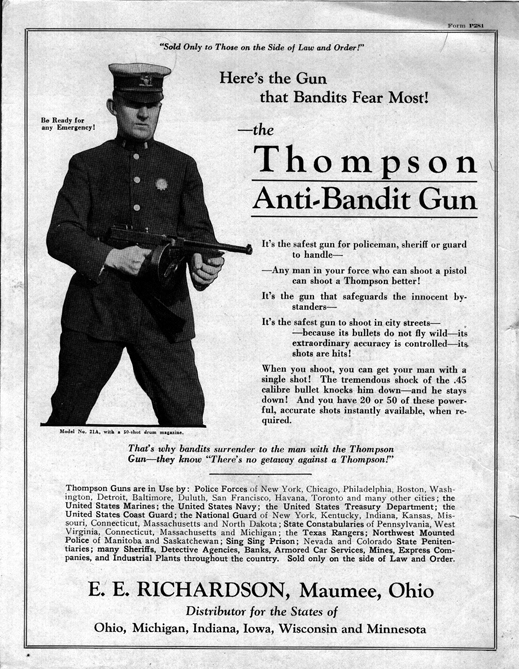
The "Anti-Bandit Gun": a 1920s advertisement of the Thompson M1921 for United States law enforcement forces

During the early 20th century, police departments in the United States adopted several military innovations such as centralized chains of command, professionalization (training and discipline), military operations and tactics (in particular, colonial counterinsurgency tactics), "open-order" units, and counterinsurgency information-gathering techniques. Many of these reforms were influenced by practices from the Philippine–American War and subsequent U.S. occupation of the Philippines. An influential advocate for these police reforms was August Vollmer, who has been described as the "father of modern policing". Vollmer devised syllabi which were used in police training courses.

The Federal Bureau of Investigation (FBI), as well as police departments in cities such as Kansas City, Missouri and Kenosha, Wisconsin, began deploying automatic weapons, including the Thompson submachine gun, and armored cars in the 1920s and 1930s.

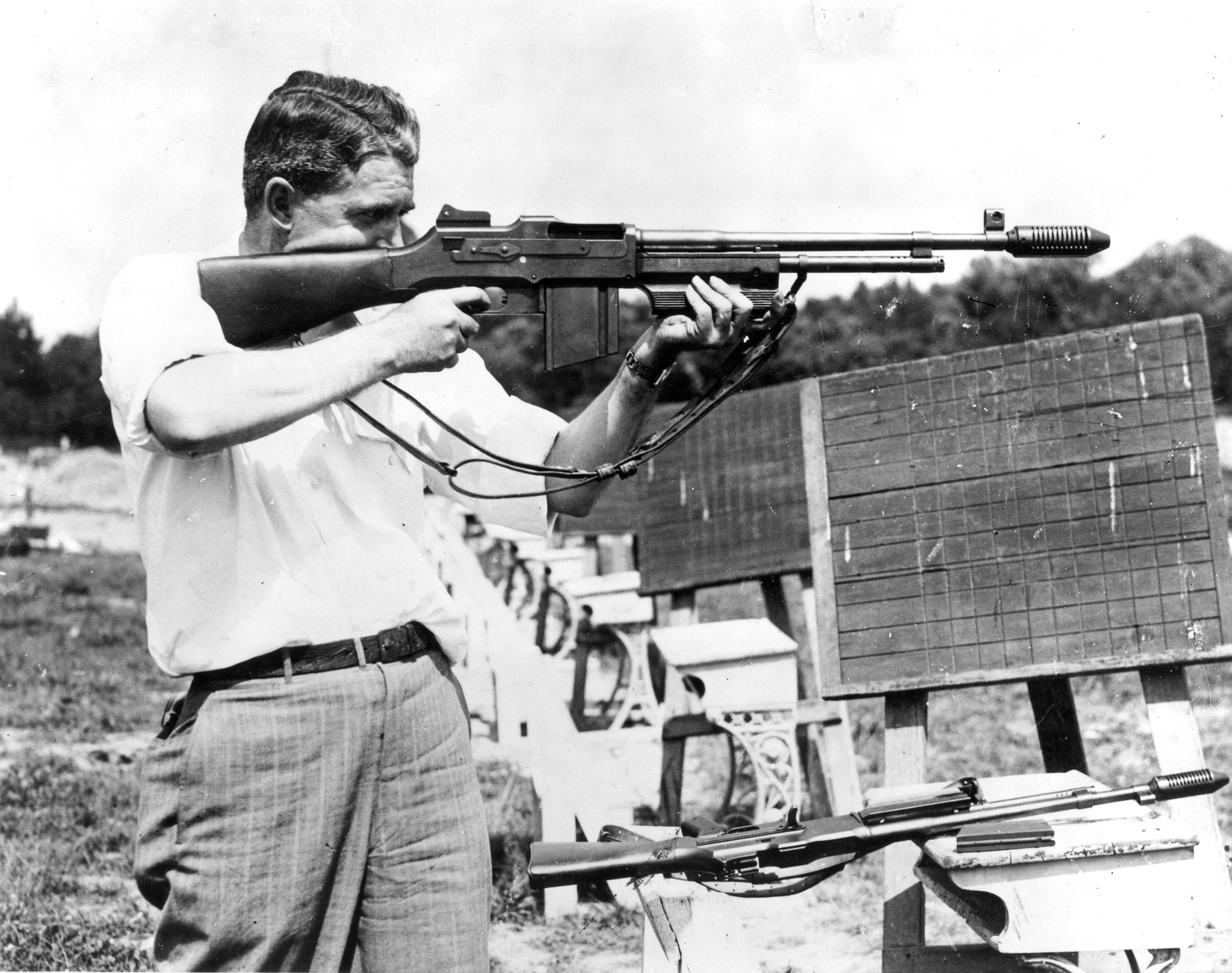
An FBI officer firing a Colt Monitor in 1936

George Fletcher Chandler, a veteran of the Pancho Villa Expedition and the first Superintendent of the New York State Police, was an early advocate of law enforcement officers wearing their weapons exposed on the outside of their uniforms.

Police militarization was escalated in the 1950s, 1960s, and 1970s as an era in which race riots and anti-war protests were common in many U.S. cities. Some^{[who?]} believe the seeming success of officers armed with military-style weapons and deployed to curtail the 1965 Watts riots, a six-day race riot sparked by conflicts with the Los Angeles Police Department (LAPD) that killed 34 people, gave way to the trend of arming and equipping law enforcement officers with battlefield weapons. Joy Rohde, a professor at the University of Michigan's Ford School of Public Policy, has published research indicating that "militarization is a mindset ... a tendency to see the world through the lens of national security, a tendency to exaggerate existing threats". Rohde traces "the origins of modern militarized policing" to the Cold War-era anti-communist paranoia, and the idea that domestic civil rights activists were similar to foreign enemies, as manifested in activities such as the CIA's Operation CHAOS.

According to Harvard University professor Elizabeth Hinton, the 1965 Law Enforcement Assistance Act ushered in a new era where the federal government facilitated the militarization of police at the state and local level across the United States.

Over the last hundred years, under the premise of combatting terrorism and keeping up with the evolution of armaments, special weapons and tactics teams have been implemented and are being used across the United States. The 1960s to the 1990s, encounters with the sophisticated weapons of narcotics trafficking groups such as the Medellín Cartel and street gangs such as the Gangster Disciples, with organized, left-wing protesters at such events as the 1968 Democratic National Convention in Chicago and the 1999 WTO Conference in Seattle, with urban riots such as the 1965 Watts riots in Los Angeles, the 1967 Detroit riot, and the 1992 Los Angeles riots led law enforcement to reconsider their standard side arms. Law enforcement agencies encountered groups such as Earth Liberation Front (ELF), and incidents such as the 1984 San Ysidro McDonald's massacre, the 1986 FBI Miami shootout between eight FBI agents and two serial bank robbers (in which the agents were out-gunned by the robbers), and the 1997 North Hollywood shootout.

Researchers David N. Falcone, Edward L. Wells, and Ralph A. Weisheit describe a historical separation of police models between small towns and larger cities, which tended to function differently with separate hierarchical systems supporting each. The militarization of both rural and urban law enforcement has been attributed to the United States' involvement in wars during the 20th century, and to increasingly frequent encounters with violent protesters and criminals with automatic weapons, explosives, and body armor, although some attribute the militarization to the more recent campaigns known as the war on drugs and the war on terror. Historian Charles A. Beard argues that cultural change during the Great Depression encouraged the militarization of law enforcement, whereas Harwood argues that the creation of SWAT teams and tactical units within law enforcement during the 1960s began the trend.

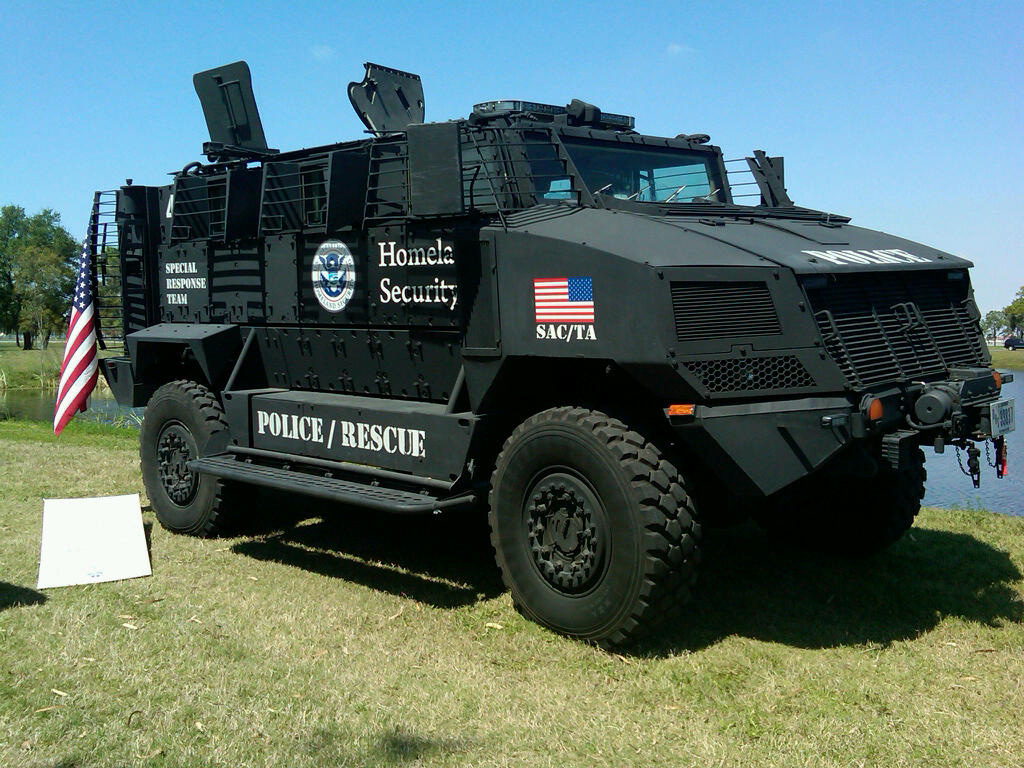
Homeland Security armored vehicle

The 1981 Military Cooperation with Civilian Law Enforcement Agencies Act allows the U.S. military to cooperate with domestic and foreign law enforcement agencies. Operations in support of law enforcement include assistance in counter-drug operations, assistance for civil disturbances, special security operations, counter-terrorism, explosive ordnance disposal (EOD), and similar activities. Constitutional and statutory restrictions and corresponding directives and regulations limit the type of support provided in this area. This allows the U.S. military to give law enforcement agencies access to its military bases and its military equipment. The legislation was promoted during the Presidency of Ronald Reagan in the context of the war on drugs, and is considered a part of a general trend towards the militarization of police. The Act is cited in the 1992 essay The Origins of the American Military Coup of 2012 as having set a precedent that the author, a United States Air Force officer, considered dangerous.

Through the 1990 establishment and growth of the Law Enforcement Support Office, or LESO, under the administration of George H. W. Bush, an especially rapid militarization of the police has been observed. LESO legally mandates the transfer of excess DoD property to law enforcement agencies. Established under the broad guidelines of fighting drugs, it has enabled police officers to use military weapons, equipment, and vehicles in almost any cases.

The 1997 North Hollywood shootout had a profound effect on law enforcement agencies. Local patrol officers at the time were typically armed with their standard issue 9×19mm pistols or .38 Special revolvers, while some had a pump-action 12-gauge shotgun available in their cars. The North Hollywood bank robbers carried fully automatic AK-47-style weapons with high capacity drum magazines and ammunition capable of penetrating vehicles and police Kevlar vests. With these weapons, two bank robbers fired approximately 1,100 rounds at officers and civilians before being killed. The robbers wore body armor which successfully protected them from bullets and shotgun pellets fired by the responding patrolmen. Police noted that the service pistols carried by the first responding officers had insufficient range and relatively poor accuracy, although a SWAT team eventually arrived with sufficient firepower. The ineffectiveness of the standard police patrol pistols and shotguns in penetrating the robbers' body armor led to a trend in the United States toward arming selected police officers, not just SWAT teams, with heavier firepower such as semi-automatic 5.56×45mm NATO AR-15-type rifles. SWAT teams, whose close quarters battle weaponry usually consisted of submachine guns that fired pistol cartridges, such as the 9×19mm Heckler & Koch MP5, began supplementing them with AR-15-type rifles and carbines.

Seven months after the incident, the Department of Defense gave 600 surplus M16s to the LAPD, which were issued to each patrol sergeant; LAPD patrol vehicles now carry AR-15s as standard issue, with bullet-resistant Kevlar plating in their doors as well. As a result of this incident, the LAPD authorized its officers to carry .45 ACP caliber semiautomatic pistols as duty sidearms, specifically the Smith & Wesson Models 4506 and 4566. Prior to 1997, only LAPD SWAT officers were authorized to carry .45 ACP caliber pistols, specifically the Model 1911A1 .45 ACP semiautomatic pistol.

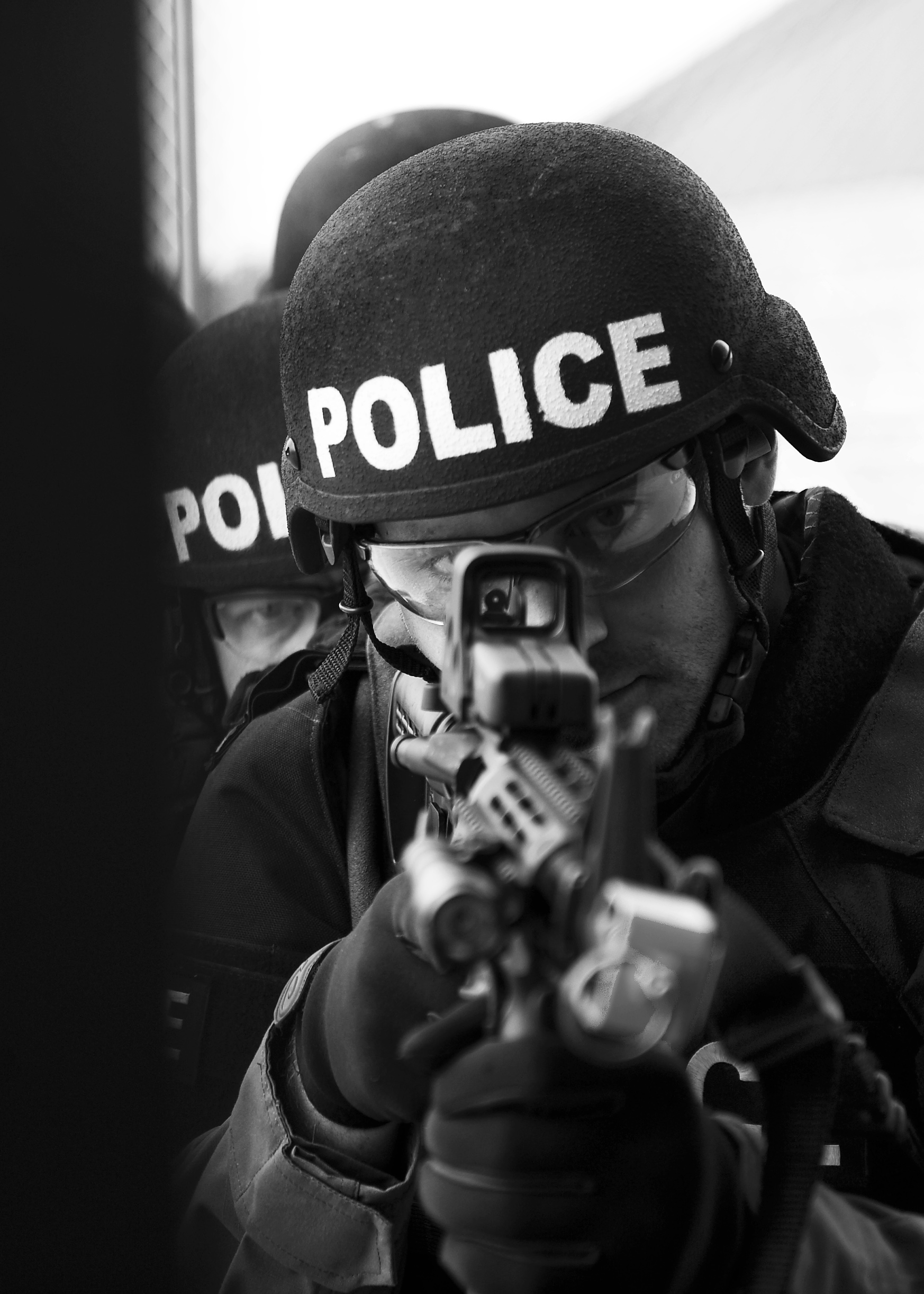
A U.S. police officer armed with a holographic sight-equipped M4 carbine rifle during a training exercise

The militarization of police escalated with the 1033 program, initiated by President George H.W. Bush in 1990, ostensibly to address organized drug trafficking. The 1033 Program was documented in action through published and televised images of excessive force and armoured vehicles broadcast during the 2014 protests in Ferguson after Michael Brown was killed by police. The National Defense Authorization Act, as part of the U.S. Government's Defense Logistics Agency Disposition Services (DLA) currently coordinates the transfer of excess military equipment to law enforcement agencies. Since 1997, 8,000 local law enforcement agencies have participated in the militarization program that has transferred $5.1 billion in military hardware from the United States Department of Defense to them. Data from 2006 to 2014 shows that local and state police departments obtained aircraft, helicopters, bayonets, knives, night-vision sniper scopes, tactical armored vehicles or MRAP's, rifles and weapons including grenade launchers, watercraft, and camouflage gear, among other military equipment.

=== 21st century ===
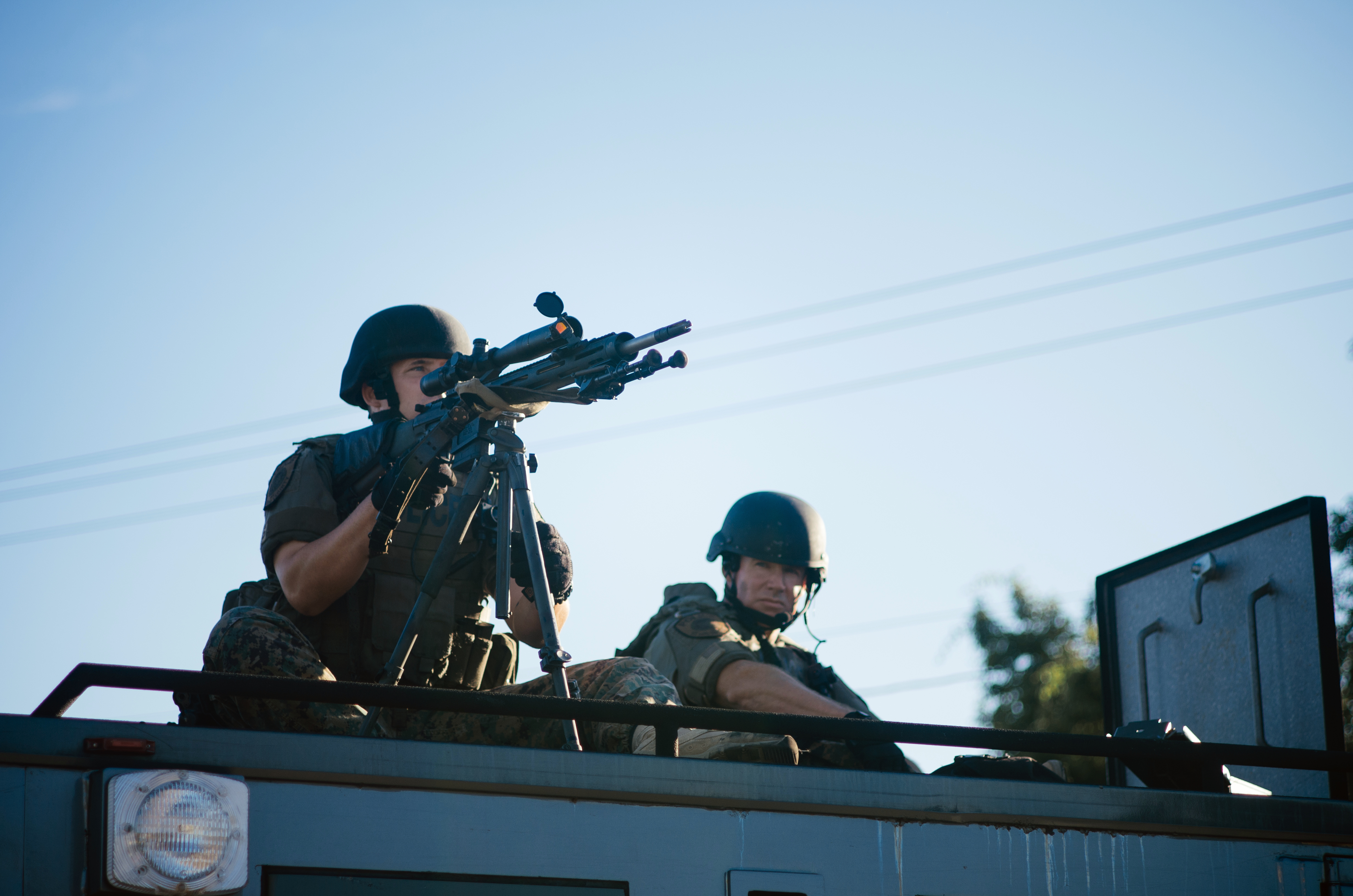
A police sharpshooter during the Ferguson unrest, 2014

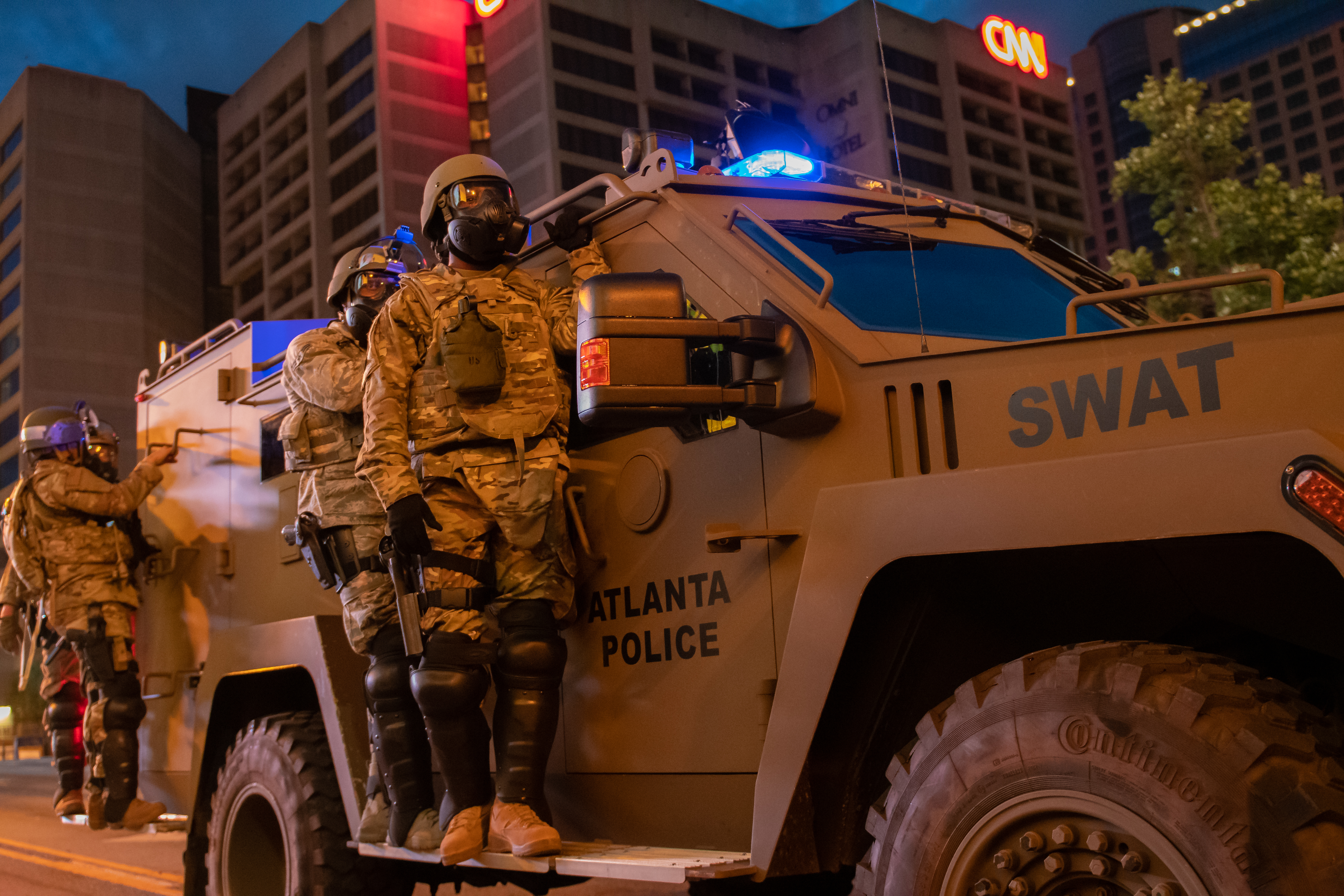
U.S. National Guard soldiers assist SWAT team members enforcing a curfew during the George Floyd protests in Atlanta, 2020

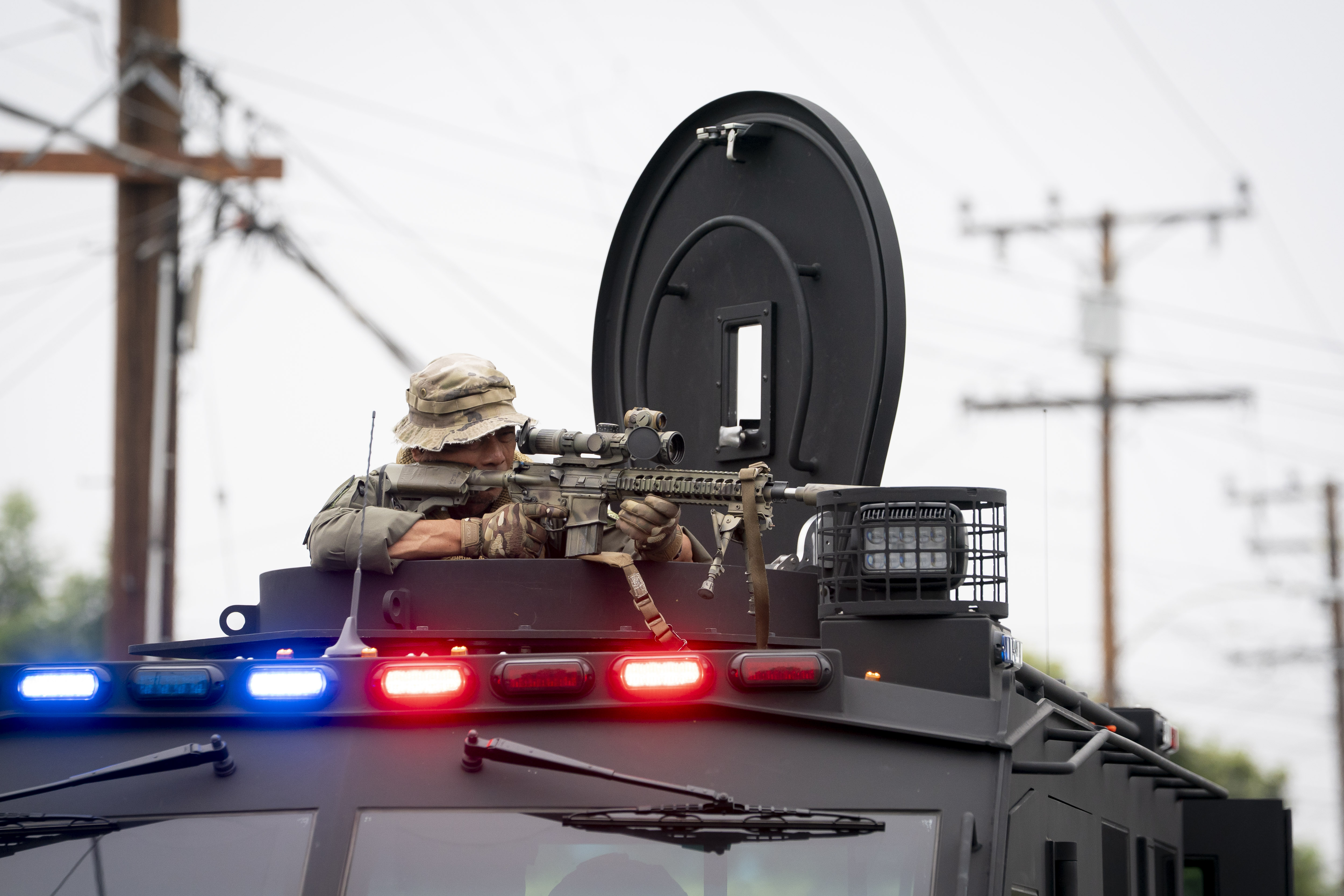
Law enforcement officer in an armored vehicle aiming an assault rifle during the anti-ICE Los Angeles protests, 2025

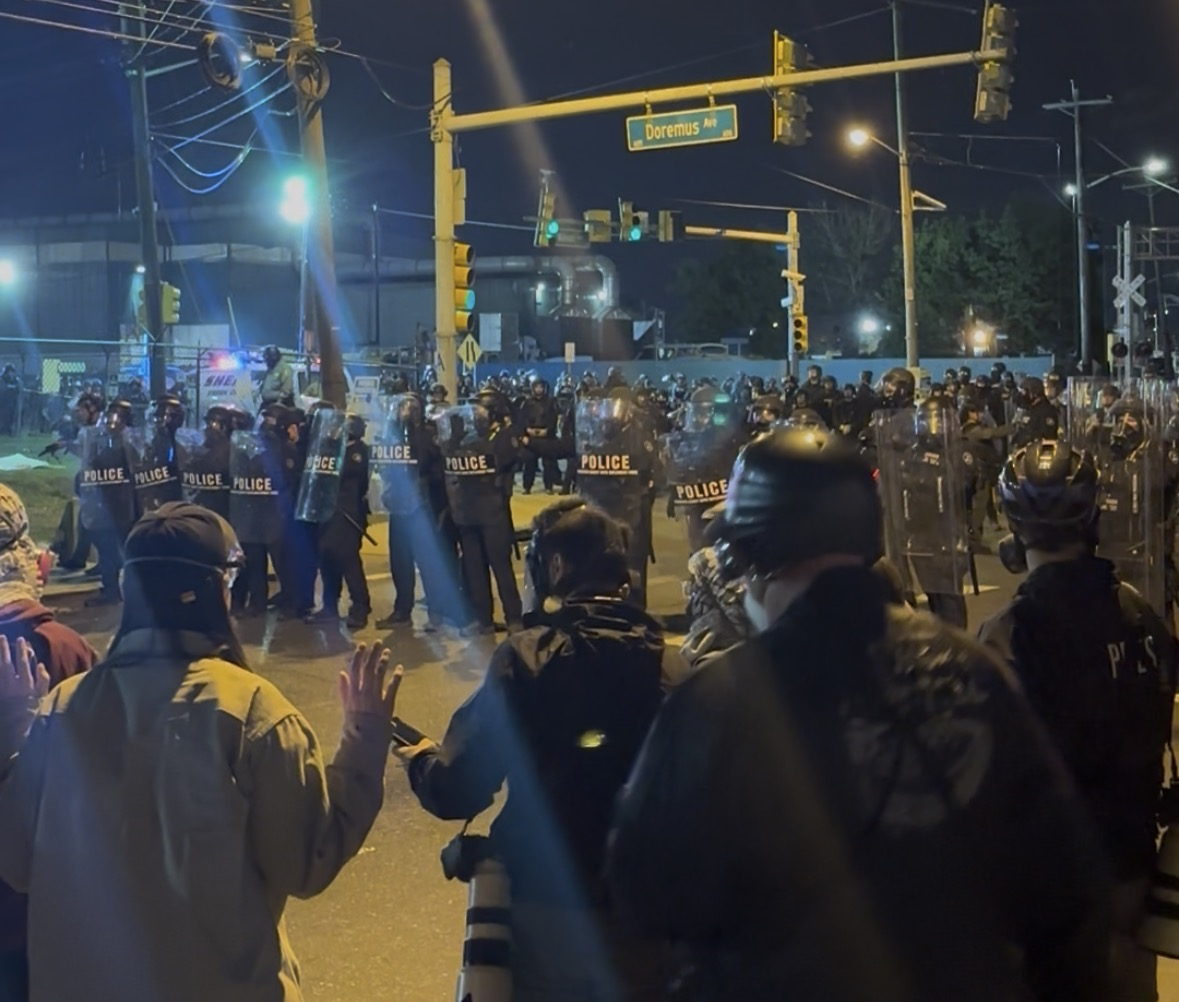
Riot police shortly before making arrests at the Delaney Hall protests, 2026

Under the Fourth Amendment, law enforcement officers must receive written permission from a court of law, or otherwise qualified magistrate, to lawfully search and seize evidence while investigating criminal activity. The requirements changed after the September 11 attacks, with the 2001 Patriot Act which gave law enforcement officers permission to search a home or business without the owner's or the occupant's consent or knowledge, amongst other provisions, if terrorist activities were suspected. The Act was criticized for its violation of civil liberties and has generated a great deal of controversy since its enactment. In United States v. Antoine Jones, the court found that increased monitoring of suspects caused by the Patriot Act directly put the suspects' constitutional rights in jeopardy. For a time, the Patriot Act allowed for agents to undertake "sneak and peek" searches, a term used to describe breaking into a business or residence and entering without judicial oversight. Critics such as the ACLU strongly criticized the law for violating the Fourth Amendment.

On May 18, 2015, President Barack Obama announced limits on the types of military equipment which can be transferred to police departments through the 1033 program and limits on the implementation of military training programs. Afterward, the military was restricted from transferring some weapons, such as grenade launchers, weaponized vehicles, and bayonets to police. Obama said, "We've seen how militarized gear can sometimes give people a feeling like it's an occupying force as opposed to a force that's part of the community that's protecting them and serving them ... So we're going to prohibit equipment made for the battlefield that is not appropriate for local police departments."

In response to Obama's announcement, the United States' largest police union, the Fraternal Order of Police, reacted negatively, pledging to push back against the new restrictions, and accusing the administration of politicizing officers' safety. The executive director of the FOP, James Pasco, stated that his group "... (would) be at (their) most aggressive in asserting the need for officer safety and officer rights in any police changes that are to be effected", and objected to a requirement that police departments obtain permission from city governments to acquire certain equipment, including riot batons, helmets and shields, through federal programs. Pasco stated "We need to only look back to Baltimore (the location of the 2015 protests following the death of Freddie Gray) to see what happens when officers are sent out ill-equipped in a disturbance situation ... Because you don't like the optics (of militarization), you can't send police officers out to be hurt or killed."

In July 2016, the Obama administration announced that it would revisit the 2015 ban on some types of military equipment for police forces, and begin a process of case-by-case review.

On August 28, 2017, U.S. Attorney General Jeff Sessions announced the lifting of restrictions on the transfer of military equipment to law enforcement agencies. Sessions said during his announcement that the Trump administration would not "put superficial concerns above public safety".

ACLU spokesperson Kaya Bennett responded to Sessions and said, "We have an epidemic in the United States of police using excessive force, particularly against people of color, with injuries and deaths mounting", and "It defies logic to arm the police with weapons of war—grenade launchers, high-caliber assault weapons and more—but that's precisely what President Trump and Attorney General Sessions have decided to do." Since the 1033 Program was initiated in 1990, more than 5.4 billion U.S. dollars of military equipment has been transferred by the Pentagon to local and state police.

Louisiana State University conducted a study that suggests the militarization of local law enforcement has not led to reduced crime levels. Particularly, the study cites evidence that the purchase of surplus military equipment does not increase the effect of policing locally.

=== Allegations of a "war on police" ===
In 2015, journalist Radley Balko wrote an opinion column in which he described statements by politicians Donald Trump, Ted Cruz, Scott Walker, and Dan Patrick that a "war on police" was taking place as "fact-free fear mongering" and a "dangerous game". The statements had been made following prominent news reports of deaths by police officers; Balko wrote "2015 is on pace to see 35 felonious killings of police officers. If that pace holds, this year would end with the second lowest number of murdered cops in decades [and] ... not only are fewer people killing police officers, fewer people are trying to harm them."

=== Notable incidents ===
==== MOVE bombing ====
On Monday, May 13, 1985, Philadelphia police attempted to clear a building occupied by MOVE black liberation activists and execute arrest warrants. This led to an armed standoff with police, who lobbed tear gas canisters at the building. The police said that MOVE members fired at them; a gunfight with semi-automatic and automatic firearms ensued. Commissioner Sambor ordered that the compound be bombed. From a Pennsylvania State Police helicopter, Philadelphia Police Lt. Frank Powell proceeded to drop two one-pound bombs (which the police referred to as "entry devices") made of FBI-supplied water gel explosive, a dynamite substitute, targeting a fortified, bunker-like cubicle on the roof of the house.

The resulting explosions ignited a fire which spread and eventually destroyed approximately 65 nearby houses. Eleven people (John Africa, five other adults, and five children aged 7 to 13) died in the resulting fire, and more than 250 people in the neighborhood were left homeless. Ramona Africa, one of the two survivors, said police fired at those trying to escape.

==== Ruby Ridge ====
In 1992, there was a deadly confrontation and a 12-day siege at Ruby Ridge in northern Idaho between Randy Weaver, his family and his friend Kevin Harris, and agents of the United States Marshals Service (USMS) and Federal Bureau of Investigation (FBI). USMS and FBI agents were armed with M16s and sniper rifles, and they used an APC. It resulted in the deaths of two Weavers (Randy's son, Sammy and his wife, Vicki) and Deputy U.S. Marshal William Francis Degan. At the subsequent federal criminal trial of Weaver and Harris, Weaver's attorney Gerry Spence made accusations of "criminal wrongdoing" against every agency involved in the incident: the FBI, USMS, the Bureau of Alcohol, Tobacco, Firearms and Explosives (BATFE), and the United States Attorney's Office (USAO) for Idaho. At the completion of the trial, the Department of Justice's Office of Professional Responsibility formed a Ruby Ridge Task Force to investigate Spence's charges. The 1994 Task Force report was released in redacted form by Lexis Counsel Connect and raised questions about the conduct and policy of all the agencies. Public outcry over Ruby Ridge led to the Senate Subcommittee on Terrorism, Technology and Government Information holding 14 days of hearings and issuing a report calling for reforms in federal law enforcement to prevent a repeat of Ruby Ridge and to restore public confidence in federal law enforcement.

==== Waco ====
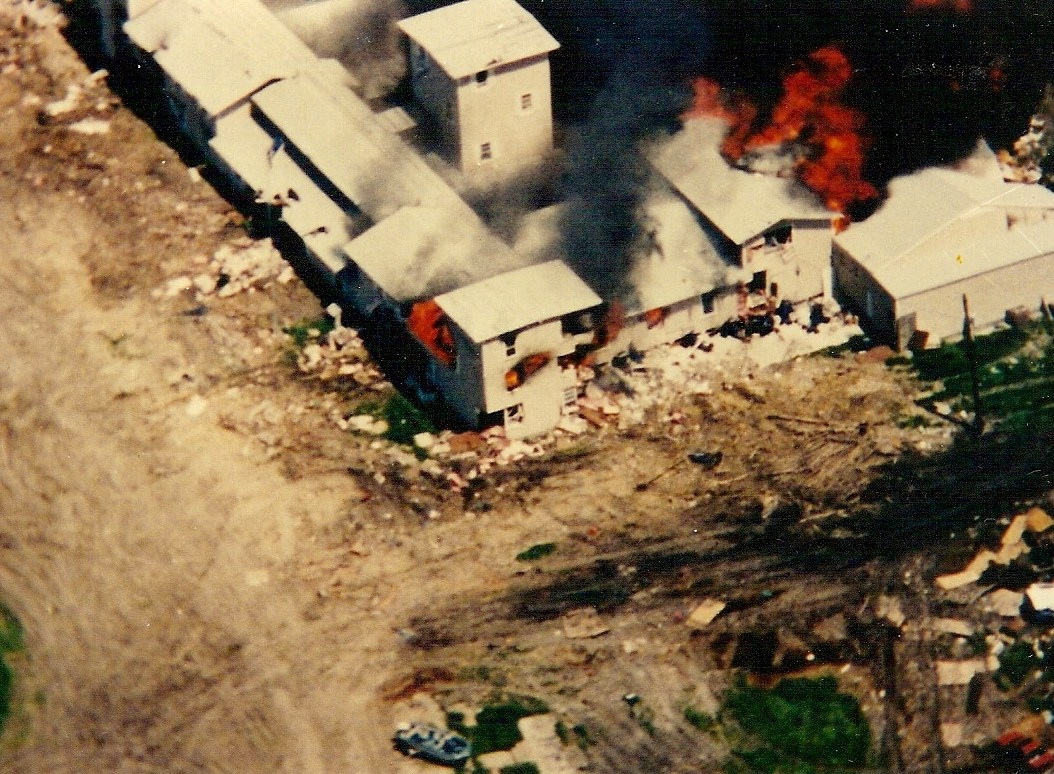
The Mount Carmel Center, engulfed in flames. Waco, Texas, April 19, 1993.

In 1993, FBI and BATFE agents used armored vehicles, tanks and attack helicopters during the siege of the Branch Davidian community in Waco, Texas. The FBI's arms included .50 caliber (12.7 mm) rifles and M728 Combat Engineer Vehicles, which are based on an M60A1 Patton main battle tank chassis. The FBI also launched 40-millimetre (1.6 in) CS grenade fired from M79 grenade launchers and fired two military M651 rounds at the Branch Davidian site. 40mm munitions recovered by the Texas Ranger Division at Waco included dozens of plastic Ferret Model SGA-400 Liquid CS rounds, two metal M651 military pyrotechnic tear gas rounds, two metal NICO Pyrotechnik Sound & Flash grenades, and parachute illumination flares.

==== Other events ====
===== 2005–2009 =====
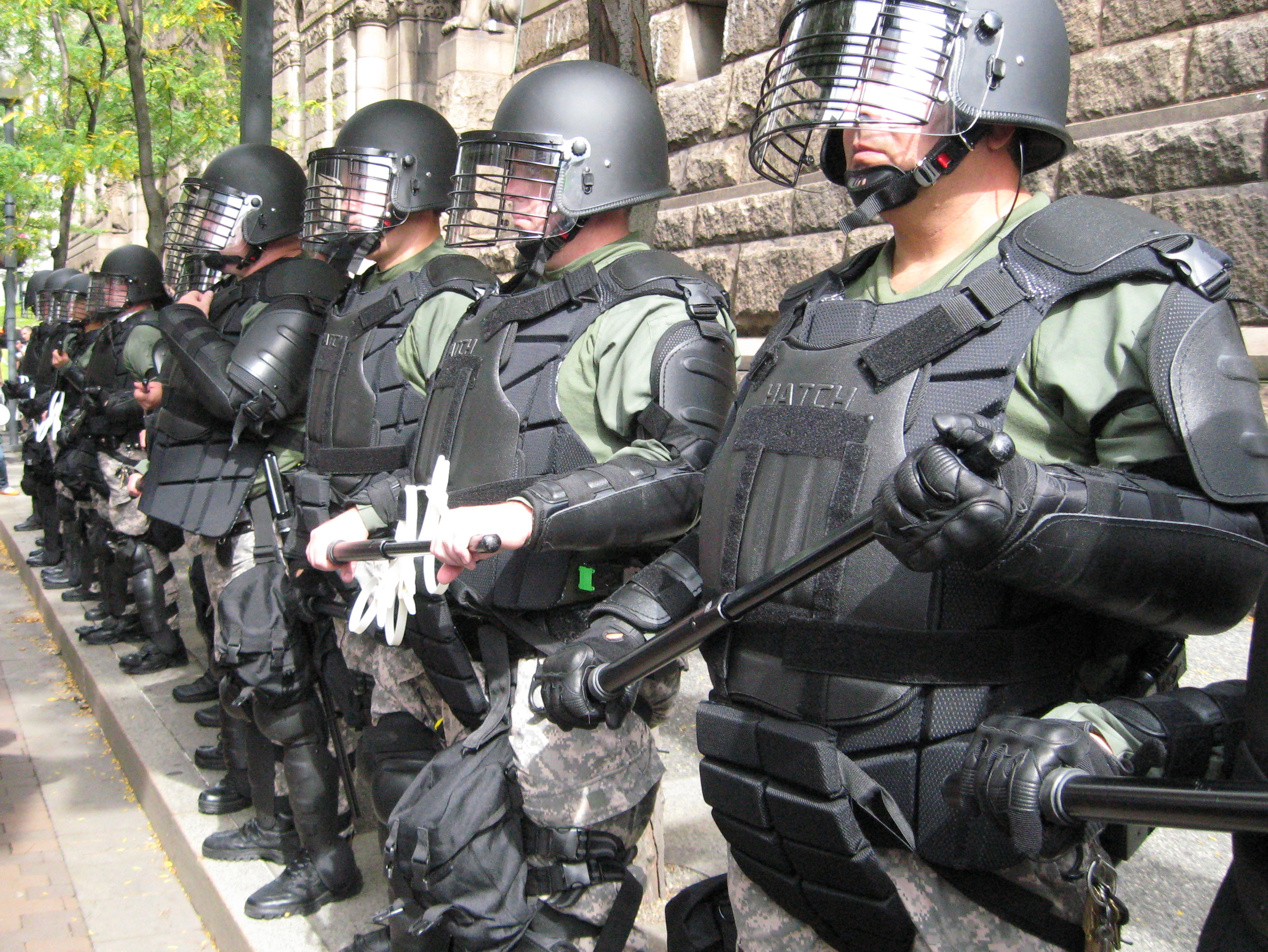
Riot police at the 2009 G20 meeting in Pittsburgh

From 2005 to 2006, the Maryland State Police (MSP) entered the names and personal information of death penalty opponents and anti-war protesters into a database used to track terrorists. Thomas E. Hutchins, former state police superintendent under Governor Bob Ehrlich, authorized the operation. Former state attorney general Stephen H. Sachs recommended that letters be sent to notify all the activists put on the list.

In the aftermath of Hurricane Katrina in New Orleans in 2005, employees of the private security firm Blackwater patrolled the city with automatic weapons. "When asked what authority they were operating under", journalist Jeremy Scahill reported, "one guy said, 'We're on contract with the Department of Homeland Security.'"

On August 25, 2008, the Denver Police Department (DPD) were accused of making mass, indiscriminate arrests of almost 100 protesters at the Democratic National Convention. In 2011, the city of Denver, Colorado agreed to pay a $200,000 settlement and to improve its crowd control training and policies.

===== 2010–2014 =====
In February 2010, the Minneapolis Police Department (MPD) raided the apartment of Rickia Russell, breaching the door and throwing in a flashbang grenade, as part of a search for drugs. At the time, Russell was eating dinner with her boyfriend and the exploding grenade gave her burns to her head and calves. No drugs were found in Russell's apartment and the Minneapolis City Council agreed to pay $1 million in damages. In January 2011, Rogelio Serrato in Greenfield, California, died of smoke inhalation after a flashbang grenade launched by the SWAT team of the Greenfield Police Department (GPD) ignited a fire in his home.

In May 2011, the Pima County Sheriff's department killed Marine and Iraq war veteran Jose Guerena, when they entered his home while serving a search warrant related to a marijuana smuggling investigation. They fired 71 shots into his home, while his wife and 4-year-old child were inside, and found no drugs nor any illegal items. The departments involved paid a $3.4 million settlement.

Referring to the 2011 Occupy Wall Street protests in New York City, Glen Greenwald wrote, "The police response was so excessive, and so clearly modeled after battlefield tactics, that there was no doubt that deterring domestic dissent is one of the primary aims of police militarization."

The Oakland Police Department (OPD) used excessive force while breaking up Occupy Oakland demonstrations in 2011. Several protesters successfully sued the city of Oakland, California for their injuries; Scott Olsen was severely injured after being hit in the head with a police projectile and was awarded $4.5 million. The city paid $1.17 million to a group of protesters, and $645,000 to Kayvan Sabeghi, who was clubbed by police.

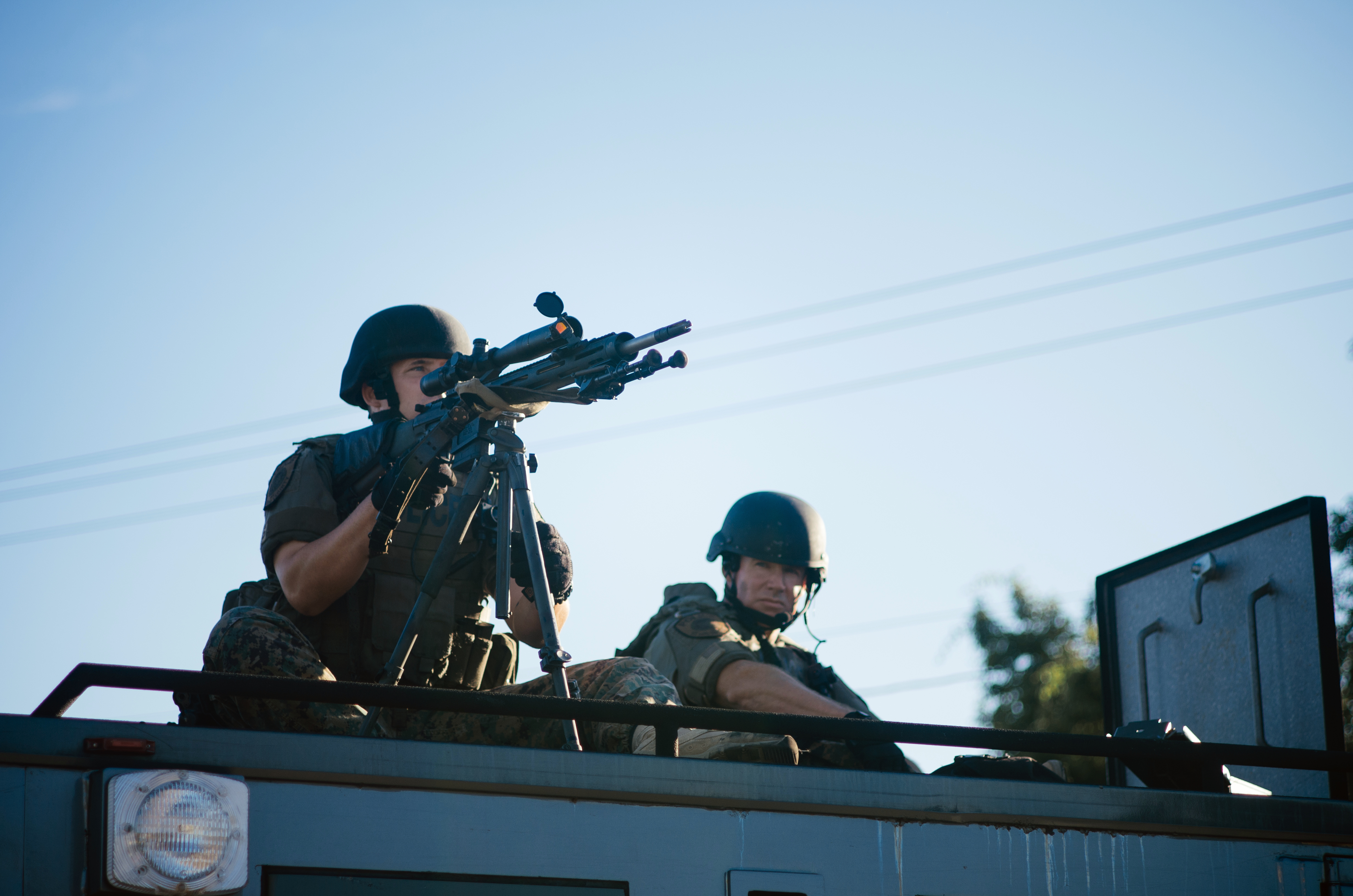
A police sniper with a sniper system provides overwatch at the Ferguson protest regarding the shooting of Michael Brown.

On May 28, 2014, a SWAT team looking for drugs in a Cornelia, Georgia home threw a flashbang grenade into the house. The grenade landed in the playpen of a 19-month-old baby boy, and the detonation severely burned and mutilated the baby's face.

In late 2014, concerns about the militarization of police arose after the shooting of Michael Brown occurred on August 9, 2014, in Ferguson, Missouri, a suburb of St. Louis. The display of military gear by area police agencies dealing with the protests received significant criticism from the media and politicians. There were concerns over insensitivity, tactics and a militarized response. In recent years, the use of military equipment and tactics for community policing and for public order policing has become more widespread. Lawmakers have begun to discuss the topic.

=== Concerns and responses ===
==== Community policing ====
The drift toward militarization concerns police officers and police policy analysts themselves. U.S. community policing grew out of the Peelian Principles of the London Metropolitan Police which emphasizes the relationship between the police and the community they serve. Police academy education patterned after a military boot camp, military-type battle dress uniforms and black color by itself may produce aggression, as do the missions named wars on crime, on drugs, and on terrorism.

In a 2013 piece in the newsletter of the DOJ's Office of Community Oriented Policing Services (COPS), COPS Senior Policy Analyst Karl Bickel warned that police militarization could seriously impair community-oriented policing. Bickel wrote that accelerating militarization was likely to alienate police relationship with the community, and pointed to a variety of factors that contribute to militarization, including the growth of SWAT; the increase prevalence of dark-colored military-style battle dress uniforms for patrol officers (which research suggests has a psychological effect of increasing aggression in the wearer), and "warrior-like" stress training in policing training, which fosters an "us versus them" approach.

==== Use of force ====
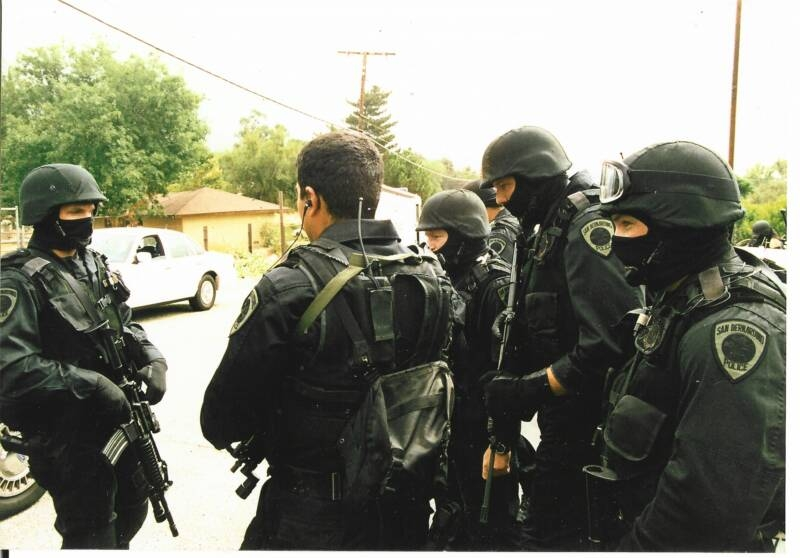
The San Bernardino SWAT team conferring on 23 September 1998

A report by The Marshall Project looking at data from the early 2010s investigated the mindset of "guardian" versus "warrior" by calculating the rate of complaints for excessive use of force against police officers who had served in the military versus police officers in general. It found higher rates for veterans in Boston (28% vs. 17%) and Miami (14% vs. 11%), but found no difference for Massachusetts State Police.

A national survey in August 2016 by the Pew Research Center found police officers who had served in the military were more likely to have fired their weapon while doing police work (32% vs. 26%).

==== Viewpoints ====
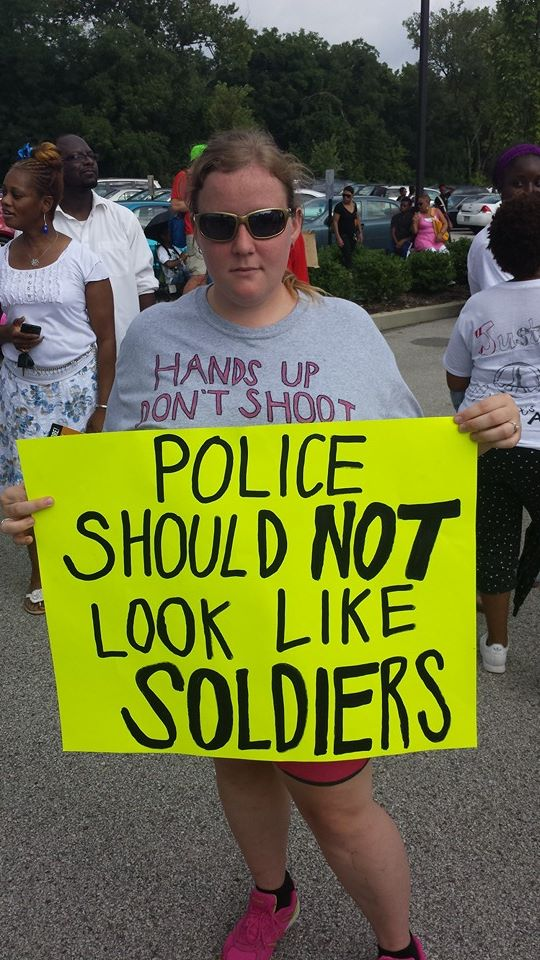
Protester with a sign criticizing the militarization of police, 2014

The ACLU has stated that local police use these "wartime weapons in everyday policing, especially to fight the wasteful and failed drug war, which has unfairly targeted people of color". Travis Irvine from The Huffington Post referred to how "local police forces now roll tank-like vehicles through our streets". Dave Pruett from The Huffington Post raised concerns about "Military Humvees, still in camouflage and mounted with machine guns, in the hands of municipal police [and] SWAT teams of police in full riot gear, bristling with automatic weapons." Former Seattle Police Chief Norm Stamper published an essay arguing that "the current epidemic of police brutality is a reflection of the militarization ... of our urban police forces, the result of years of the 'war on drugs' and the 'war on terror'". Senator Rand Paul has proposed a demilitarization of U.S. police departments, stating that "The images and scenes we continue to see in Ferguson resemble war more than traditional police action."

Chuck Canterbury, the president of the Fraternal Order of Police, argued that the equipment received from the federal government had been properly de-militarized, and that it was being used to protect civilians from violent crime. He further stated that the use of the equipment by law enforcement was necessary to protect civilians, since mass shootings have taken place across the United States, even in small towns. Responding to claims that law enforcement officers were being given tanks, Canterbury argued that the vehicles being used by law enforcement were not armed, and that they were being used across the United States to protect other officers.

On March 23, 2015, a Department of Justice investigation into use of deadly force by the Philadelphia Police Department in the period from 2007 to 2013 found that the way officers are trained may be a contributing factor to excessive use of deadly force. The report found that a) many officers have the mistaken assumption that being "in fear of their life" is justification for the use of deadly force, but fear should not be a factor—it's a reasonable belief that deadly force is necessary to avoid death or serious injury; b) instruction about policies on the use of force is confusing; c) most training scenarios end in some type of use of force and officers are rarely, if ever, trained how to resolve confrontations peacefully; d) 80% of suspects shot by police were black—black suspects were also more than twice as likely to be shot due to a "threat perception failure"; and e) no consistent procedure was in place for shooting investigations, no audio or video recordings of officer interviews were being made, and officers are often interviewed months after the incidents.

In a report released in June 2015, Amnesty International alleged that the United States does not comply with the UN Basic Principles on the Use of Force and Firearms by Law Enforcement Officials.

Two independent, peer-reviewed studies published in 2020 have found that militarized police officers are neither safer nor more effective at reducing crime.

==== Intelligence-gathering and surveillance ====
In a January 2017 report Cato Institute criminal justice policy analyst Adam Bates argues that in the United States, "an increasingly militarized domestic police force" is characterized by "mission creep [that] has not been limited to weapons and tactics. What the War on Drugs has done for police militarization, the War on Terror is now doing for police intelligence gathering, and the privacy of millions of Americans is at risk."

The ACLU has raised concerns about military involvement in surveillance of peaceful protesters. The ACLU pointed, for example, to U.S. Department of Defense (DOD) issuance of Threat and Local Observation Notices (TALON) depicting Veterans for Peace and other anti-war groups as "terrorist threats". The ACLU also raised concerns about military involvement in "fusion centers".

==== Civil liberties ====
The federal Posse Comitatus Act of 1878 forbids the U.S. military from conducting domestic law enforcement activities, embodying "the traditional American principle of separating civilian and military authority". There have been exceptions made, however: in 1981, Congress enacted legislation allowing military involvement in drug interdiction at U.S. borders, and eight years later in 1989 "designated the Department of Defense as the 'single lead agency' in drug interdiction efforts". In the late 1990s, following the Oklahoma City bombing, there were proposals to further limit the act to allow military participation in law enforcement activities in chemical/biological weapon and terrorism cases. These anti-terrorism proposals were criticized by some commentators on the basis that they were a threat to civil liberties. Writers such as U.S. Air Force officer Charles J. Dunlap, Jr. critiqued proposals to use the military for internal security, on the basis that "No one should suffer the illusion that military forces could ever execute the laws with the same sensitivity to civil liberties as regular police forces." Dunlap argued that "the central imperatives of military service" was "destroying targets and undermining enemy command and control"—a skill that does not necessarily carry over into intelligence-gathering and investigation. Under this view, "a successful policization of the armed forces may well render it incapable of defeating authentic external military threats".

The accelerating militarization of regular law enforcement during the war on drugs and post-September 11 war on terror, however, prompted some commentators to express alarm at the blurring of the distinction between civil and military functions, and the potential to erode constraints on governmental power in times of perceived crisis. A 2010 paper published in the journal Armed Forces & Society examined "role convergence, that is, evidence that significant segments of police operations in the United States have taken on military characteristics; and evidence indicating that many U.S. military initiatives have taken on policing characteristics". It concluded that "for individual citizens and for society as a whole, at least one aspect of role convergence—the militarization of the police—is potentially troublesome. If this convergence results in the police adopting not only military-type tactics and procedures but also military attitudes and orientations, the convergence may seriously threaten traditional civil rights and liberties."

A 2014 ACLU report, War Comes Home: The Excessive Militarization of American Policing, concluded that "American policing has become unnecessarily and dangerously militarized ..." The report cites an increase in unnecessarily aggressive raids, "tactics designed for the battlefield", and equipment such as armored personnel carriers and flashbang grenades—as well as a lack of transparency and oversight. Writers such as Ilya Shapiro and Randal John Meyer have argued that militarization leads to "extreme constitutional violations".

==== SWAT teams and military-style raid tactics ====
Peter Kraska, a criminal justice professor at Eastern Kentucky University, found that the prevalence of SWAT teams, among police agencies serving populations of at least 50,000 people, doubled from the mid-1980s to the late-1990s, rising to 89% of police agencies by the end of this time period. Among smaller police agencies (covering areas with between 25,000 and 50,000 people), the proportion with SWAT teams rose from 20% in the mid-1980s to 80% in the mid-2000s. Kraska says: "When people refer to the militarization of police, it's not in a pejorative or judgmental sense. Contemporary police agencies have moved significantly along a continuum culturally, materially, and operationally, while using a Navy SEALs model. All of those are clear indications that they're moving away from a civilian model of policing."

A 2014 ACLU report, War Comes Home: The Excessive Militarization of American Policing, concluded that "American policing has become unnecessarily and dangerously militarized ..." The report examined 818 uses of SWAT teams by more than 20 law enforcement agencies in 11 U.S. states from the period of July 2010 to October 2013. Military-style tactics used by such teams include nighttime raids, use of battering rams, use of flashbangs, overwhelming displays of force, and the wearing of helmets and masks.

The use of SWAT teams became especially common for drug searches. The ACLU study found that 62% of SWAT deployments were for drug raids, and that 79% involved raids on private homes; the study found that only "7% fell into those categories for which the technique was originally intended, such as hostage situations or barricades". Other reporting indicates that the majority of SWAT deployments is for serving high risk warrants.In some cases, civilians, including infants, were killed or injured due to police use of force in military style raids. In other cases, residents of affected neighborhoods reported experiencing psychological trauma as a result of militaristic law-enforcement tactics. The use of force and military-style equipment during such raids prompted criticism, particularly from civil libertarians such as Radley Balko, who wrote on the topic in his book Rise of the Warrior Cop: The Militarization of America's Police Forces.

The Chicago Police Department (CPD) have been accused of operating a secret "black site" in their Homan Square facility where suspects were held without being booked and registered and where they could not be found by their attorneys or families. Suspects were allegedly shackled and beaten.

==== Federal efforts to curb militarization ====
From 1997 to 2016, the United States Department of Justice (DOJ) has gone to court to challenge policing practices in more than 24 cities to protect the civil rights of the public.

The Obama administration made a broad push police reform. In 2015, the Task Force for 21st Century Policing recommended restricting federal transfers of military surplus equipment, such as grenade launchers and armored vehicles, from the Defense Department to law enforcement agencies via the 1033 program. President Obama implemented the recommendations by in Executive Order 13688, in what observers saw as a bid to shift police sway from "away from creeping militarization and toward community policing". The Trump administration signaled a dramatic policy shift, with Donald Trump pledging during the campaign to reinstate the entire 1033 program. In 2017, the Trump administration announced it would reinstate the program.

== Types of teams and weapons ==
=== SWAT teams ===
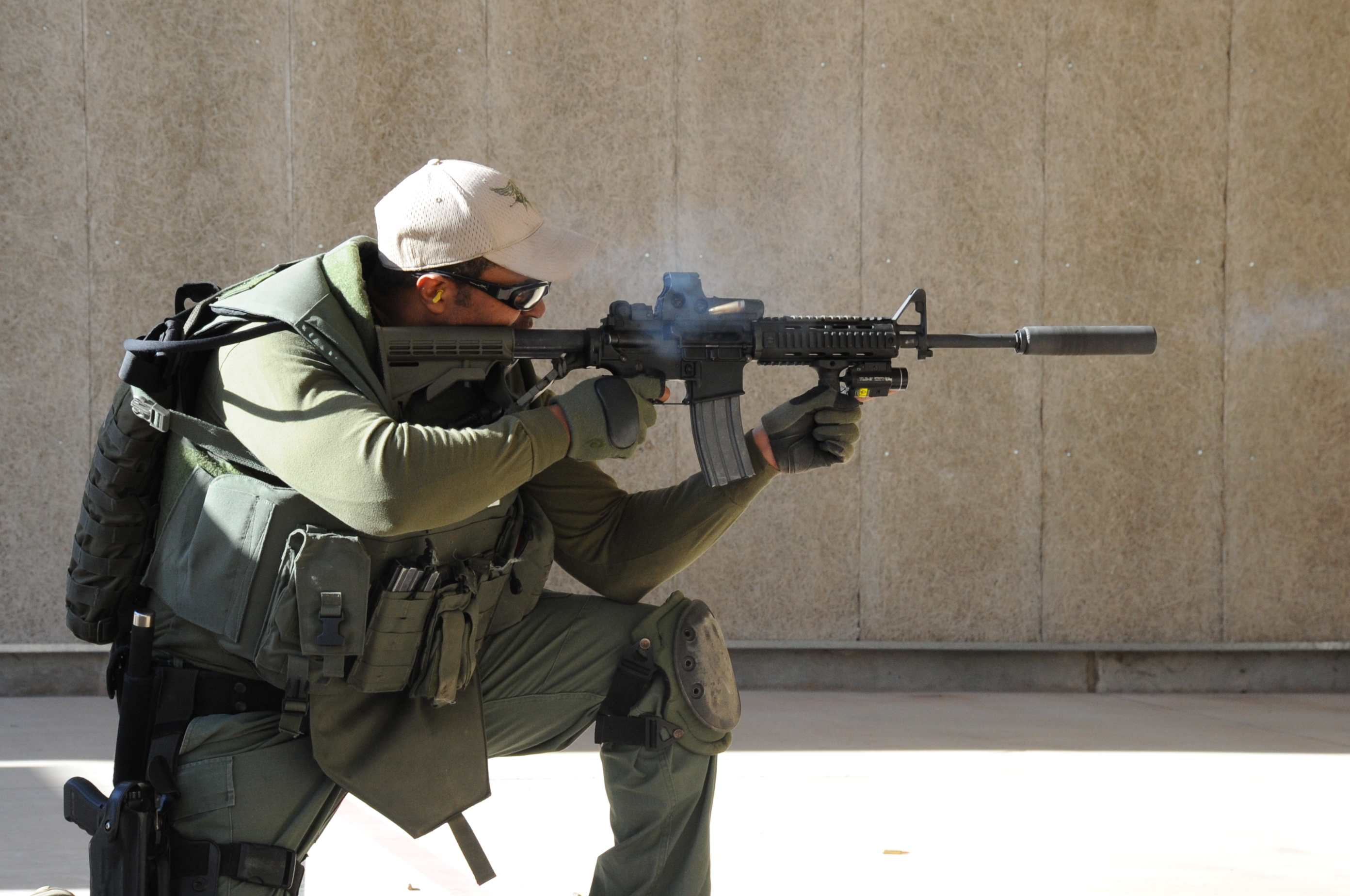
A member of the Wichita Falls SWAT team conducts a rifle drill.

Special Weapons and Tactics (SWAT) teams are law enforcement units in the United States that use specialized or military equipment and tactics. First created in the 1960s for riot control or violent confrontations with criminals, the number and usage of SWAT teams increased in the 1980s and 1990s during the war on drugs, and in the aftermath of the September 11 attacks. In the United States today, SWAT teams are deployed 50,000–80,000 times every year, 80% of the time to serve search warrants, most often for narcotics. SWAT teams are increasingly equipped with military-type hardware and are trained to deploy against threats of terrorism, for crowd control, and in situations beyond the capabilities of ordinary law enforcement, sometimes deemed "high-risk". Other countries have developed their own paramilitary police units (PPU)s that are also described as or compared to SWAT police forces. SWAT units are often equipped with specialized firearms including submachine guns, assault rifles, breaching shotguns, sniper rifles, riot control agents, and stun grenades. They have specialized equipment including heavy body armor, ballistic shields, entry tools, armored vehicles, advanced night vision optics, and motion detectors for covertly determining the positions of hostages or hostage takers, inside enclosed structures.

The increased use of SWAT teams is a hallmark of increased police militarization. The Cato Institute's Radley Balko wrote that during the 1980s, there were about 3000 SWAT raids a year and as of 2005 there were 40,000 a year. SWAT teams being used for gambling crackdowns and serving a search warrant are routine in some places, like Fairfax, VA. "There has been a more than 1400% increase in the amount of SWAT deployments between 1980 and 2000, according to estimates ... by Eastern Kentucky University professor Peter Kraska." Balko states that in 2007, "... a Dallas SWAT team raided a Veterans [organization's] ... charity poker games. In 2010, a team of heavily armed Orange County, Florida, sheriff's deputies raided several barbershops, holding barbers and customers at gunpoint while they turned the shops inside out. Of the 37 people arrested, 34 were taken in for "barbering without a license". The Orlando barbershop raids were subsequently challenged in court, and in 2014, the U.S. Court of Appeals for the Eleventh Circuit ruled that it violated "clearly established Fourth Amendment rights" for the government to conduct "a run-of-the-mill administrative inspection as though it is a criminal raid".

The ACLU has stated that "... heavily armed SWAT teams are raiding people's homes in the middle of the night, often just to search for drugs", causing people to "needlessly di[e] during these raids", in which neighborhoods are turned into "warzones".

=== Snipers ===
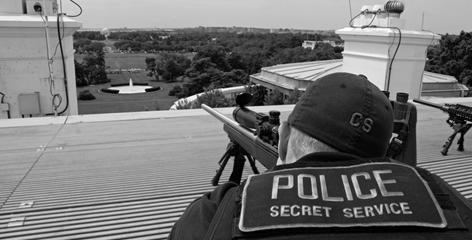
A U.S. Secret Service sniper on the roof of the White House

Law enforcement snipers, commonly called police snipers, and military snipers differ in many ways, including their areas of operation and tactics. A police sharpshooter is part of a police operation and usually takes part in relatively short missions. Police forces typically deploy such sharpshooters in hostage scenarios. This differs from a military sniper, who operates as part of a larger army, engaged in warfare. Sometimes as part of a SWAT team, police snipers are deployed alongside negotiators and an assault team trained for close quarters combat. As policemen, they are trained to shoot only as a last resort, when there is a direct threat to life; the police sharpshooter has a well-known rule: "Be prepared to take a life to save a life." Police snipers typically operate at much shorter ranges than military snipers, generally under 100 meters (109 yd) and sometimes even less than 50 meters (55 yd). Both types of snipers do make difficult shots under pressure, and often perform one-shot kills.

Police units that are unequipped for tactical operations may rely on a specialized SWAT team, which may have a dedicated sniper. Police snipers placed in vantage points, such as high buildings, can provide security for events. In one high-profile incident, Mike Plumb, a SWAT sniper in Columbus, Ohio, prevented a suicide by shooting a revolver out of the individual's hand, leaving him unharmed.

The need for specialized training for police sharpshooters was made apparent in 1972 during the Munich massacre when the German police could not deploy specialized personnel or equipment during the standoff at the airport in the closing phase of the crisis, and consequently all the Israeli hostages were killed. While the German army did have snipers in 1972, the use of snipers of the German army in the scenario was impossible due to the German constitution's explicit prohibition of the use of the military in domestic matters. This lack of police trained snipers was later addressed with the founding of the specialized police counter-terrorist unit GSG 9, which subsequently became a widely copied model for a police special forces unit.

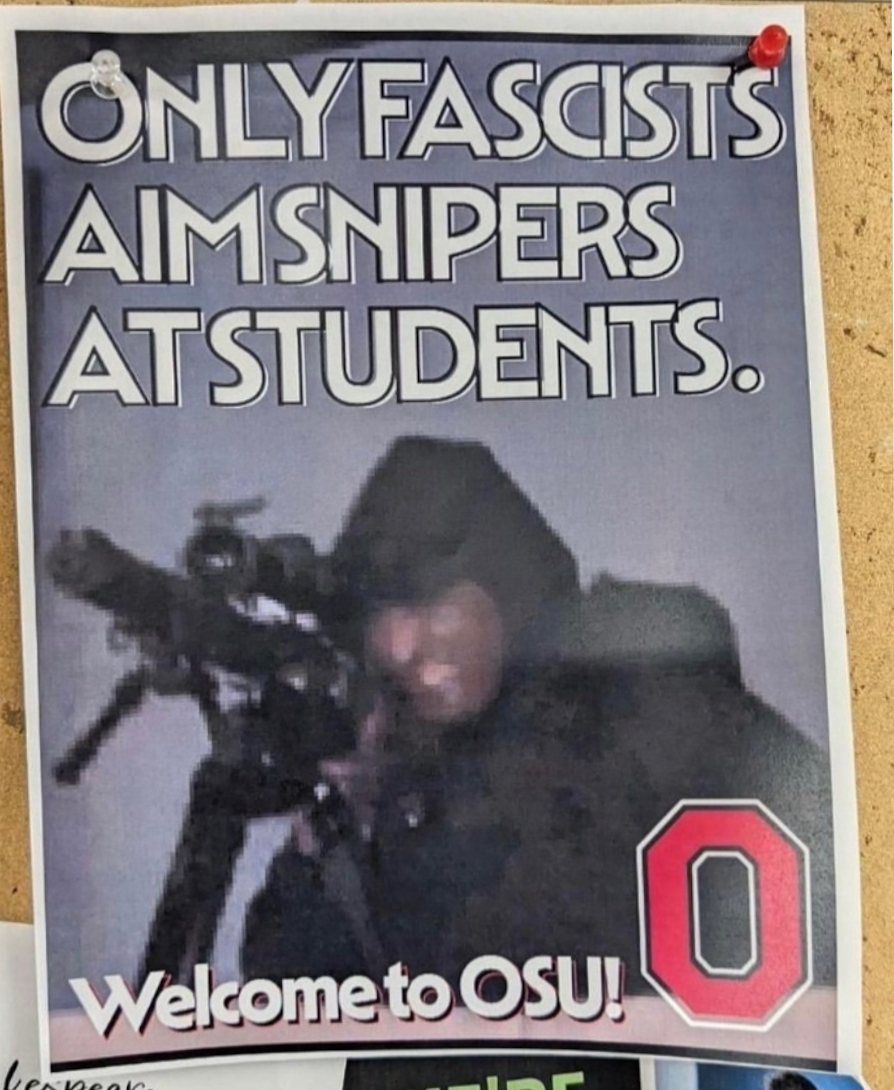
Poster at Ohio State University with photograph of sniper from the OSU Gaza Solidarity Encampment, 2024

In September 2015, a San Bernardino Sheriff's Department sniper shot a suspect in a fast-moving car from a helicopter. The suspect leapt from his car and died on the side of the road, but his vehicle continued forward, striking another vehicle and critically injuring three civilians.

In April 2024, during the Gaza war protests at universities sparked by the Columbia University Gaza Solidarity Encampment, police aimed snipers at students at Ohio State University and Indiana University protests.

=== Protest policing ===
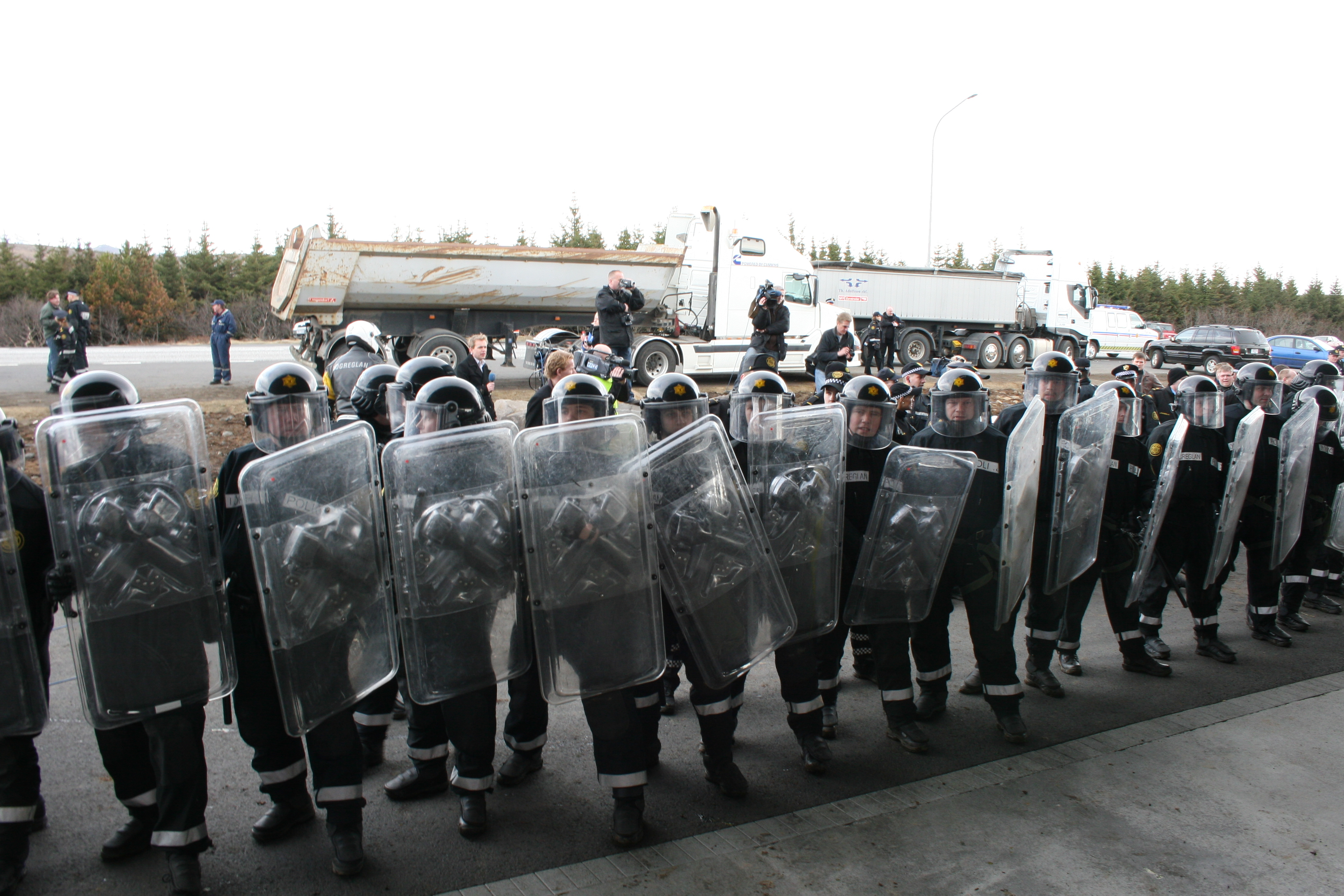
Rank of Icelandic National Police officers in full riot gear during the 2008 Icelandic lorry driver protests

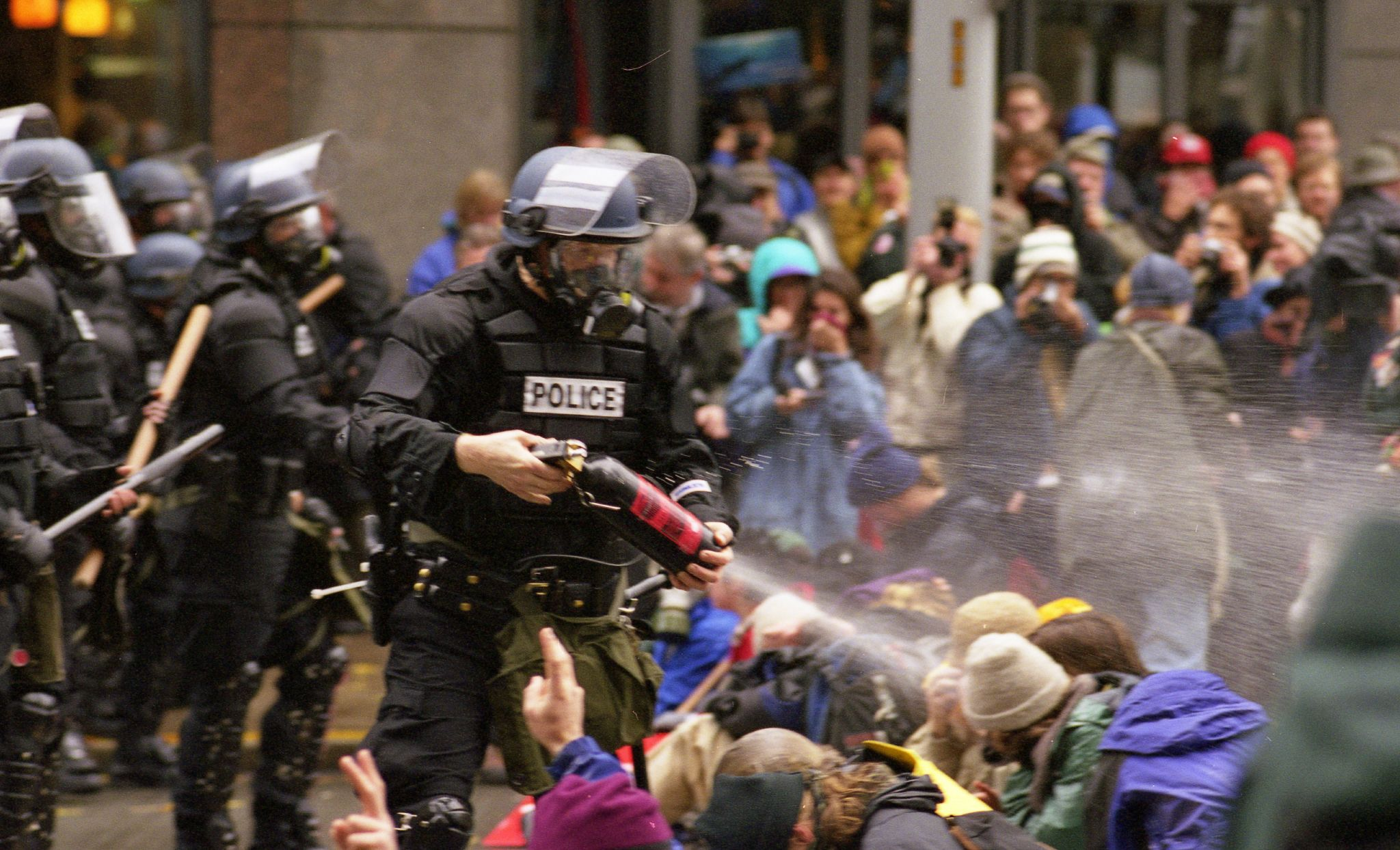
A riot policeman sprays pepper spray at seated protesters during the WTO protests in Seattle in 1999.

Observers have noted the militarizing of the policing of protests. Riot police are police who are organized, deployed, trained or equipped to confront crowds, protests or riots. Riot police may be regular police who act in the role of riot police in particular situations or they may be separate units organized within or in parallel to regular police forces. Riot police are used in a variety of different situations and for a variety of different purposes. They may be employed to control riots as their name suggests, to disperse or control crowds, to maintain public order or discourage criminality, or to protect people or property. In some cases, riot police may function as a tool of political repression by violently breaking up protests and suppressing dissent or civil disobedience.

Riot police often use special equipment termed riot gear to help protect themselves and attack protesters or rioters. Riot gear typically includes personal armor, batons, riot shields and riot helmets. Many riot police teams also deploy specialized less-than-lethal weapons, such as pepper spray, tear gas, rifles that fire rubber bullets or plastic bullets, flashbang grenades, and Long Range Acoustic Devices (sound cannons).

The police tactics used during the 2001 Quebec City protest serve as an example of the approaches used by North American riot police. During the protest, riot police fired tear gas canisters, water cannon, and rubber bullets, dispersing large groupings of protesters both violent and peaceful, including teach-ins and teams of medics providing first aid to other protesters. Other tactical interventions aimed at arresting various perceived movement leaders. Allegedly, "plastic bullets were being used increasingly [by riot police], and from guns with laser sights so at night people could often see that the cops were intentionally aiming for heads or groins".

=== Military weapons ===
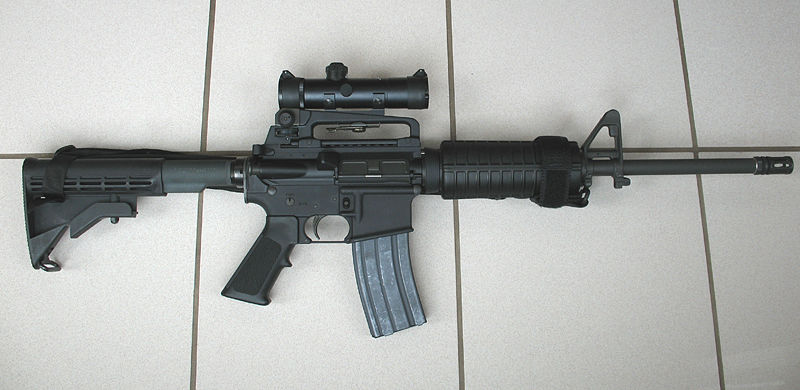
A Colt AR-15 Carbine with a Colt 4×20 scope

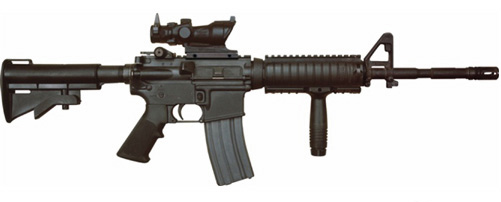
A Colt M4 Carbine with ACOG scope

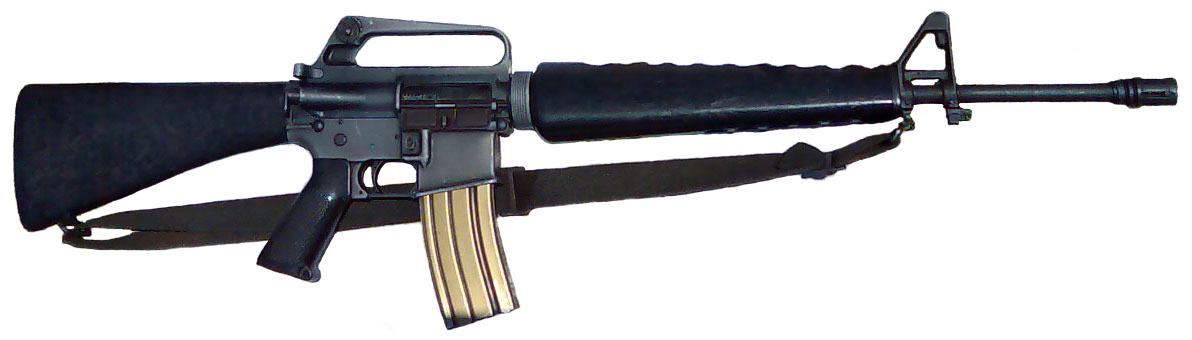
An M16A1 automatic rifle

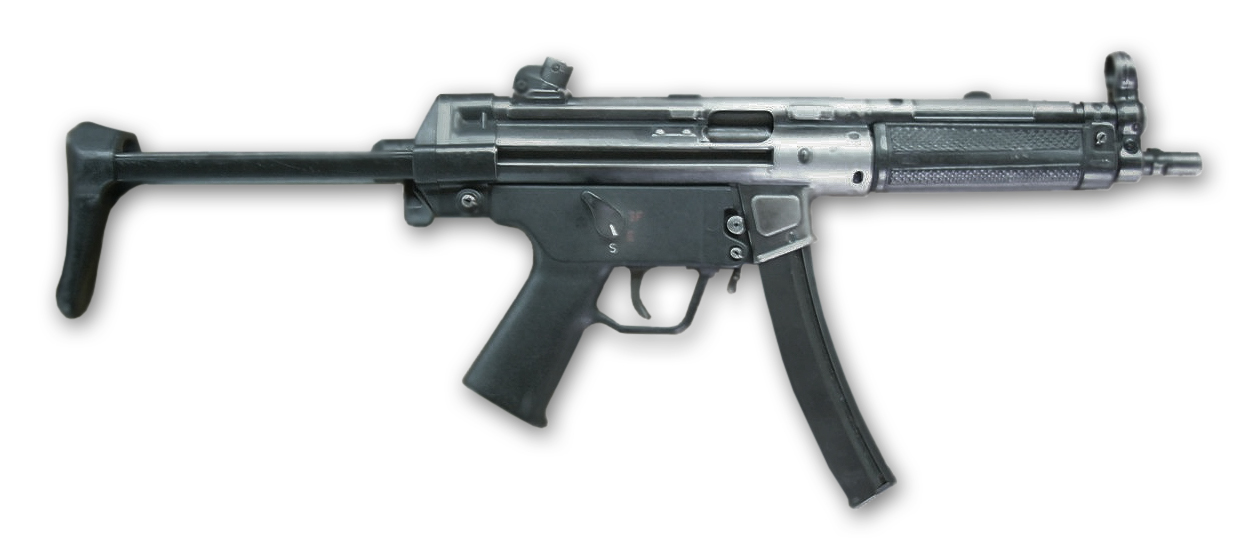
The Heckler & Koch MP5, a submachine gun

Between 2006 and 2014, almost 5,000 M16 rifles were distributed to local and state law enforcement agencies in Ohio under the surplus military equipment program.

== Effects ==
A 2017 study found a statistically significant positive relationship between militarization of the police and fatalities from officer-involved shootings. The study authors note the parcity of data for "police violence against the public" and describe the study as a "best attempt at establishing the proposed relationship between military transfers and violence". A 2021 study found that the relationship between 'military surplus transfers' and 'fatal force' goes away after accounting for 'agency size'.

Two studies in the American Economic Journal: Economic Policy concluded that federal grants of military equipment to local police under the 1033 Program led to a reduction in crime. However, these studies were criticized for using inappropriate data. Studies that used better data failed to replicate the findings of those studies.

A 2018 study published in the journal PNAS found that, in the state of Maryland, "militarized police units are more often deployed in communities with large shares of African American residents, even after controlling for local crime rates". The study also found that, across the United States, "militarized policing fails to enhance officer safety or reduce local crime".

== In popular culture ==
The 2015 video game Battlefield Hardline depicts a militarized police, and both police and criminals wielding military-grade equipment, including rifles, machine guns and grenade launchers. The developer's insistence on "fantasy" while meticulously recreating LA areas and loosely basing crimes in the game on real-life crimes has subsequently been criticized.

The documentary Peace Officer, which is about police militarization in the U.S., won the 2015 Documentary Feature Competition Grand Jury award at the South by Southwest Film Festival.

The documentary Do Not Resist by Craig Atkinson is also critical of the phenomenon of police militarization, as exemplified by law enforcement training courses taught by retired military officer Dave Grossman, who tells police officers, "You are men and women of violence." The film won the award for "Best Documentary Feature" at the Tribeca Film Festival.

== See also ==
- COINTELPRO
- High policing
- Homeland security
- Human rights
- Human rights in the United States
- Indefinite detention without trial
- Internal troops
- Law Enforcement Support Office
- Martial law
- Military police
- NSA warrantless surveillance (2001–07)
- Patriot Act
- Police brutality
- Police state
- PRISM (surveillance program)
- Police tactical unit
- Separation of military and police roles
- State defense force
- Third wave of autocratization
