= Secret service =

Type of government agency

A secret service is a government security agency or intelligence agency concerned with clandestine gathering of intelligence data and conducting covert operations related to national security. The tasks and powers of a secret service can vary greatly from one country to another. For instance, a country may establish a secret service which has some high policing powers (such as surveillance) but not others. The powers and duties of a government organization may be partly secret and partly not. The person may be said to operate openly at home and secretly abroad, or vice versa. Authoritarian and totalitarian regimes usually operate as police states where a secret service may assume the role of a secret police. In the USA, government agencies usually considered secret services include the Central Intelligence Agency, the Defense Intelligence Agency, the Federal Bureau of Investigation, the National Security Agency, the United States Secret Service and the Drug Enforcement Administration.

Various states and regimes, at different times and places, established bodies that could be described as a secret service or secret police – for example, the agentes in rebus of the late Roman Empire were sometimes defined as such. In modern times, the French police officer Joseph Fouché is sometimes regarded as a pioneer of secret intelligence; among other things, he is alleged to have prevented several murder attempts on Napoleon during his time as First Consul (1799–1804) through a large and tight net of various informants. William Wickham is also credited with establishing one of the earliest intelligence services that would be recognized as such today and a pioneer of basic concepts of the profession, such as the "intelligence cycle".

== See also ==
- Espionage
