= High policing =

Policing to protect the government

High policing is a form of intelligence-led policing that serves to protect the national government or a conglomerate of national governments from internal threats; that is, any policing operations integrated into domestic intelligence gathering, national security, or international security operations for the purpose of protecting government.

== Etymology ==
The term "high policing" was introduced into English language police studies by Canadian criminologist Jean-Paul Brodeur in a 1983 article entitled "High Policing and Low Policing: Remarks about the Policing of Political Activities" and derives from the French haute police, the political police force established in France under Louis XIV.

== Aims ==
The term "high policing" refers to the fact that such policing benefits the "higher" interests of the government rather than individual citizens or the mass population. It also refers to the fact that high-policing organizations are endowed with authority and legal powers superior to that of other types of police organizations.

The conventional designation for this category of policing in liberal democracies is a security agency, however, and it should not be conflated with secret police, although secret police organizations do use high policing methods. Calling it "secret" or "political" policing is too vague since all police work is somewhat both secret (police generally do not reveal their methods until a case is completed) and political (police enforce laws determined by the political system in power).

The primary tool of high policing is intelligence, which is derived from both human ("Humint") and technological sources. The former includes the use of secret informants to gather information on the activities of citizens, while the latter includes electronic surveillance and eavesdropping, such as closed-circuit camera monitoring, telephone tapping, and Internet tapping.

== Agencies ==
High policing in western democratic countries is performed by both national police forces and specialized security agencies, such as the FBI and the Secret Service in the United States, MI5 in the United Kingdom, the Special Detective Unit and Directorate of Intelligence in Ireland, the Australian Security Intelligence Organisation, the Canadian Security Intelligence Service, and the New Zealand Security Intelligence Service.

These organizations usually confront domestic or internal threats to national security, whereas the military or military intelligence agencies generally handle foreign or external threats. However, this distinction can become blurred, especially in cases involving terrorism.

== See also ==
- Anti-terrorism legislation
- Homeland security
- Rule of law
- Security
- State of emergency
- Terrorism
