= Fort Worth shooting =

Fort Worth shooting may refer to:

- 1999 Wedgwood Baptist Church shooting
- 2013 killing of Jerry Waller
- 2019 killing of Atatiana Jefferson
