= Hallandale Beach Police Department =

Law enforcement agency in Florida, US

- Abbreviation: HBPD

Jurisdictional structure
- Legal jurisdiction: Hallandale Beach, Broward County, Florida, U.S.
- General nature: Local civilian police

Operational structure
- Headquarters: 400 S. Federal Highway; Hallandale Beach, Florida, U.S.
- Agency executive: Michel Michel, Chief of Police

Facilities
- Stations: 1

Website
- http://www.hallandalebeachfl.gov/index.aspx?NID=17

The Hallandale Beach Police Department is the law enforcement agency of Hallandale Beach, Florida. Its headquarters is located in a municipal building at 400 South Federal Highway, Hallandale Beach, FL 33009. In 2022, the chief of police is Michel Michel.

On June 9, 2020, the entire SWAT team resigned en masse from the team (though not from the Police Department), citing "today's political climate" and "several recent local events". They also stated that "the team is minimally equipped, undertrained and often times restrained by the politicization of our tactics to the extent of placing the safety of dogs over the safety of team members." They criticized the city's government, and especially Hallandale Beach Vice Mayor Sabrina Javellana, for making "ignorant and inaccurate statements attacking the lawful actions of the city's officers and SWAT team, both from the dais and her social media accounts." Among their grievances is that the Police Chief "took a knee" in solidarity with the George Floyd Protestors.

Radley Balko, author of The Rise of the Warrior Cop, cited Hallandale Beach in the book as an example of why small cities do not need SWAT teams. He also notes that "at times, the annual number of people killed by its police department has nearly equaled the number of murders in the city. (Nationally, the ratio over the past few years has been about 15 murders for every killing by police.)"

== Howard Bowe incident ==
The "lawful actions" the officers refer to deal with the killing of Howard Bowe. A SWAT team of 15 officers showed up at his home on May 8, 2014, to serve a search warrant as part of a narcotics investigation. They shot and killed his chained pit bull, broke down the door, deployed a stun grenade, and fired a single shot into the unarmed man's chest as he stood in his kitchen in his underwear. The man died in hospital 11 days later. A grand jury did not indict the shooter, and the Police Department's Internal Affairs cleared the officers as well. However, the city had to pay $425,000 to settle a civil lawsuit filed by Bowe's heirs.

Javellana and other demonstrators called for the State Attorney to reopen the case. According to her, "We have our own George Floyds and Breonna Taylors". She "explained what she said was in reference to the police department's history of SWAT raids from 2016–2014 in northwest Hallandale Beach, which she said is historically black."

According to Mayor Joy Cooper, since Bowe's death, the Police Department has been reformed, revising policies on use of force, instituting body cameras, de-escalation training, and diversity training. Also, the Police Department has again become accredited. In January 2018, Cooper was arrested on multiple felony charges and suspended from office by Governor Rick Scott.

== Eduardo Prieto, Jr., incident ==
In December 2016, a grand jury did not indict three officers for the 2012 shooting of Eduardo Prieto Jr.

== Michael Eugene Wilson ==
In May 2016, Michael Eugene Wilson was shot and killed by a police officer.

== Daniel Dunkelberger ==
In 2018, two officers were placed on administrative leave after a bystander recorded them beating a mentally challenged man, Daniel Dunkelmeyer, with batons.
