= List of killings by law enforcement officers in the United States, October 2019 =

This is a list of people reported killed by non-military law enforcement officers in the United States in October 2019, whether in the line of duty or not, and regardless of reason or method. The listing documents the occurrence of a death, making no implications regarding wrongdoing or justification on the part of the person killed or officer involved. Killings are arranged by date of the incident that caused death. Different death dates, if known, are noted in the description. The table below lists 96 people.

== October 2019 ==
Date	Name (age) of deceased	Race	State (city)	Description
2019-10-31	Francis Calonge (33)	White	San Jose, CA	
2019-10-31	Danny James Hall (34)	White	Bascom, FL	
2019-10-31	Edward Roe (56)	Unknown race	Pearson, GA	
2019-10-30	Michael Pinkerman (26)	White	Ona, WV	
2019-10-30	Billy Kongphouthakhoun (24)	Asian	Fresno, CA	
2019-10-30	John Feggins (24)	Black	Maryland (Baltimore)	
2019-10-30	Ricardo Myers (62)	White	Lancaster, CA	
2019-10-28	Terry Wayne Chanley (45)	White	Evansville, IN	
2019-10-27	Dana Sherrod Fletcher (39)	Black	Madison, AL	
2019-10-27	Luis Arreguin-Lara (50)	Hispanic	Tulsa, OK	
2019-10-27	Dean Thomas (63)	White	Madison, WI	
2019-10-27	Earnest Easterling (25)	Black	Carmichael, CA	
2019-10-27	Arturo Moreno (42)	Hispanic	Porterville, CA	
2019-10-27	Cezannie Mount (24)	Black	Long Beach, CA	
2019-10-26	Edward Terry Robinson (50)	White	Silver City, OK	
2019-10-26	Nan Ahao (45)	Asian	Athens, GA	
2019-10-26	Unnamed person	Unknown race	Brawley, CA	
2019-10-26	Johnathan Wayne Slattery (27)	White	Boyne Falls, MI	
2019-10-25	Shannon Gail Rupert (45)	White	Bossier City, LA	
2019-10-25	Kwesi Ashun (36)	Black	New York (Brooklyn)	
2019-10-25	Anthony John Michael Zapier (19)	White	Morristown, TN	
2019-10-25	Clayton Floyd Andrews (40)	White	Grove, OK	
2019-10-25	Raymond V. Tahod (27)	Hispanic	New Mexico (Albuquerque)	
2019-10-25	Matthew James Fleming	Unknown race	Dalton, GA	
2019-10-25	Anthony Viadero (31)	Unknown race	Cumming, GA	
2019-10-24	Michael Allen Babcock (53)	White	Greenville, NC	
2019-10-23	Victor Hernandez (29)	Hispanic	New York (New York)	
2019-10-23	Delfon Garnell Kinney Sr. (48)	Black	Long Beach, CA	
2019-10-23	Jordan Wade Waldrop (34)	White	Sweetwater, TX	
2019-10-23	Vincent "Vince" Michael Smith (29)	White	Huntington, IN	
2019-10-23	James F. Plymell III (45)	White	Albany, OR	
2019-10-23	Matthew Wayne Sutton (41)	White	El Paso, TX	
2019-10-23	David W. Shafer (61)	Unknown race	Spokane, WA	
2019-10-22	Dominador Araquel Rabot (55)	Unknown race	Carson, CA	
2019-10-21	Claudia Nadia Rodriguez (37)	Hispanic	Nevada (Henderson)	Claudia Nadia Rodriguez was heard sounding agitated on a 9-1-1 call while her seven-year-old son could be heard pleading to the 911 operator by yelling, "911 please help," and "My mom is trying to kill me." When police arrived on scene, Body Cam footage shows a bloody child appear from the door and an agitated Claudia approached the first officer as he entered the apartment. The officer and Claudia began to struggle before Claudia got possession of the first officer's firearm. The first shot was from the gun Claudia had possession of before the second officer fired two shots at Claudia. Claudia later died from her injuries. The boy was transported to Sunrise Hospital in critical condition. He received emergency surgery for 25 stab wounds, all allegedly inflicted by Claudia and is expected to survive.
	Joseph Bernhard-William Kiser (21)	White	Dayton, OH	
2019-10-21	Jason Alan Livengood (39)	White	Hillsboro, OR	
2019-10-21	Adam Martinez (36)	Hispanic	Denver, CO	
2019-10-21	Christopher McCorvey (36)	Black	Tillmans Corner, AL	
2019-10-20	Steven Day (30)	Black	St. Louis, MO	
2019-10-20	Ronald Dale McLemore (51)	White	Leesburg, FL	
2019-10-20	Amber Lea Dewitt (33)	White	Boise, ID	
2019-10-19	Rickey Leonard Harris (61)	Unknown race	Easley, SC	
2019-10-19	Terry Countryman (34)	White	Palestine, TX	
2019-10-19	Ruben Escudero (41)	Hispanic	Victorville, CA	
2019-10-18	David Sanders (46)	Unknown race	White Pigeon, MI	
2019-10-18	Charles Tsakiris (38)	White	Farmingdale, NJ	
2019-10-18	Malachii Alexander Crane aka Phillip Rudd (29)	White	Idaho Falls, ID	
2019-10-17	Marcus Hartsfield (27)	White	Oakridge, OR	
2019-10-17	Allan Feliz (31)	Black	New York (Bronx)	
2019-10-17	Cameron L. Bennett (21)	Black	Fayette, MS	
2019-10-17	Christopher Dequan Crosby (34)	Black	Warren, AR	
2019-10-16	Chase Andrew Austin (28)	White	Roanoke, VA	
2019-10-16	Lazzeri James Frazier (21)	Black	Los Angeles, CA	
2019-10-15	Nasheem Prioleau (30)	Black	New York (Brooklyn)	
2019-10-15	David James Bamber (28)	White	Wendell, ID	
2019-10-15	Akinyia Malik Jerome Gray (26)	Black	Stone Mountain, GA	
2019-10-15	Cameron Ely (30)	White	California (Santa Barbara)	Cameron Ely, son of actor Ron Ely stabbed his mother to death at the Hope Ranch residential community along the Santa Barbara coast where the couple lived, and called 9-1-1 telling the operator that his father attacked her. When the officers arrived on the scene, Ron who was unharmed told the officers that his son left. The officers found him later outside the home holding a knife, and the officers shot and killed him.
2019-10-15	Dennis Patrick (28)	White	Jamestown, NC	
2019-10-14	unidentified male	Unknown	California (Encino)	Two passengers in an Uber began fighting each other, causing the driver to call police. One of the passengers exited the vehicle and jumped into the opposite lane, where a California Highway Patrol vehicle struck and killed him.
2019-10-14	Daniel James Wood (29)	Hispanic	New Mexico (Albuquerque)	
2019-10-14	Christopher Whitfield (31)	Black	Ethel, LA	
2019-10-14	Bonny Thomas (54)	White	Georgia (Athens)	Police were called about a woman holding a knife and gun at around 10:15 a.m. in 100 block of Chalfont Drive near Westchester Drive. When an officer arrived, he told her to drop the knife but refused and ran towards him with the knife raised above her head in her left hand and her right hand under her shirt. The officer fired a single shot from his service revolver that hit her torso. After additional officers arrived, ACCPD administered first aid to Thomas until EMS arrived. Thomas was transported to a local hospital where she later died.
2019-10-14	Victor Ervin Jarvis (61)	Black	High Point, NC	
2019-10-13	Levy Isaac Madueno Santibanez (19)	Hispanic	Arizona (Glendale)	
2019-10-13	Jose Eduardo Flores (26)	Hispanic	Buckeye, AZ	
2019-10-13	Emilio Mojica (22)	Hispanic	Texas (Corpus Christi)	
2019-10-12	Matthew Graham (32)	Unknown race	Myrtle Beach, SC	
2019-10-12	Sawandi Toussaint (21)	Black	El Monte, CA	
2019-10-12	Atatiana Jefferson (28)	Black	Texas (Fort Worth)	Police arrived at her home after a neighbor called a non-emergency number, stating that Jefferson's front door was open. Police body camera footage showed that when she came to her window to observe police outside her home, Officer Aaron Dean shot through it and killed her. Police stated that they found a handgun near her body, which according to her nephew, she was pointing out the window before being shot. On October 14, 2019, Dean resigned from the Fort Worth Police Department and was arrested and charged with murder. He was subsequently convicted of manslaughter and sentenced to more than 10 years in custody.
2019-10-11	David Doyle (56)	Unknown race	Arizona (Tucson)	
2019-10-11	Matthew Abrams (40)	Unknown race	Pine Bluff, AR	
2019-10-11	Fernando Mora (57)	Hispanic	North Port, FL	
2019-10-11	Sayven Lane Rowland (19)	White	Kiowa, OK	
2019-10-10	Norbert Beyet (58)	White	Farmington, NM	
2019-10-10	Michael John (24)	Black	Oklahoma (Oklahoma City)	
2019-10-10	Michael Phillip Uccello (48)	White	Lancaster, CA	
2019-10-09	Michael Veatch (32)	White	Deer Island, OR	
2019-10-09	Leo Craig (31)	Black	Oklahoma (Oklahoma City)	
2019-10-08	Christopher G. Louras (33)	White	Rutland, VT	
2019-10-08	Zachary Aldrige Hall (28)	White	Layton, UT	
2019-10-08	Crederick Joseph (37)	Black	Beaumont, TX	
2019-10-08	Joseph Francis Cimino (48)	White	Nebraska (Lincoln)	
2019-10-07	Bobby Lee Vaughn (54)	Native American	Tahlequah, OK	
2019-10-07	Joshua Chase Conner (31)	White	Kountze, TX	
2019-10-06	Bradley Arning (42)	Unknown race	Maryland Heights, MO	
2019-10-06	Marco Antonio "Tonito" Vasquez (37)	Hispanic	Whittier, CA	
2019-10-06	Maurice Holly (55)	Black	Herald, CA	
2019-10-05	Christopher George Massey (33)	White	Carrollton, TX	
2019-10-05	Sergey Rumyantsev (25)	White	Newman Lake, WA	
2019-10-05	Geoffrey Pernell Williams (28)	Black	Scranton, PA	
2019-10-04	Bruce Williams Clark (37)	White	Florida (Jacksonville)	
2019-10-03	Ronald Audette (61)	Unknown race	Grovetown, GA	
2019-10-01	Jack Thomas "Sam" Naylor (50)	White	Drennen, WV	
2019-10-01	Roy Tucker (75)	White	Elkton, KY	
2019-10-01	Joseph Jesk (32)	White	Palos Hills, IL	

== See also ==
- Death in custody § United States
- Henry A. Wallace Police Crime Public Database
- List of cases of police brutality
- List of countries with annual rates and counts for killings by law enforcement officers
- List of law enforcement officers killed in the line of duty in the United States
- List of law enforcement officers convicted for an on-duty killing in the United States
- List of police reforms related to the George Floyd protests
- List of unarmed African Americans killed by law enforcement officers in the United States
- Lists of killings by law enforcement officers
- Police brutality in the United States
- Police misconduct § United States
- Police riot § United States
- Police use of deadly force in the United States
