= Killing of Nathan Heidelberg =

2019 death of U.S. police officer

- Date: March 5, 2019
- Time: Approx. 1:30 a.m. (CST)
- Location: Midland, Texas, U.S.; 32.0445°N 102.1343°W
- Type: Death of police officer
- Cause: Gunshot wound
- Motive: Self-defense
- Deaths: 1
- Burial: Greenwood Cemetery, Midland
- Arrests: 1
- Charges: Murder, second-degree manslaughter
- Trial: November 30 – December 8, 2021
- Verdict: Not guilty

Very early on March 5, 2019, Midland, Texas, United States, police officer Nathan Heidelberg (born December 2, 1990) was shot and killed while responding with fellow officers to a residence where a burglar alarm had gone off, the first Midland police officer killed on the job in over 50 years. The homeowner, David Wilson, an oil company executive who had fired the fatal shot in the belief that Heidelberg was an intruder attempting to force his way into his house, was arrested and charged with manslaughter, later increased to murder by a grand jury. In late 2021, he was acquitted.

There were several communication issues during the incident. The initial silent alarm soon turned out to have been erroneous, but that was not relayed to officers who were already responding to what they believed was a possible burglary in progress. The police assumed the alarm company would inform the Wilsons that they were on the way. Heidelberg may not have adequately made it clear that the police were on the scene. The Wilsons had also spoken with 911 on two separate occasions before learning that the suspects outside were actually the police after a third and final call was made from dispatch.

The largest jury pool in Midland's history was called to hear the trial. Wilson relied on Texas's stand-your-ground law and castle doctrine in his defense. After his acquittal he and his lawyers brought an unsuccessful action to have the Midland County district attorney removed from office over alleged misconduct before the trial. Both he and Heidelberg's family are suing the alarm manufacturer and installer. The road on which Midland police headquarters is located has been renamed in Heidelberg's memory.

== Background ==
A native of Wichita Falls, David Wilson grew up watching his father work as operations manager for a small independent oil company that drilled 120 wells in Garza County's Dorward Field, after the family moved to Snyder, 90 miles (140 km) northeast of Midland. In his later teens he began working for his father's company, both managing investments and in field operations. "I didn't know how, what, where or when, but I knew I wanted to start my own oil company."

In 2002, during Wilson's college years, while he was also working for an oil-services company in Ira, an opportunity arose to buy six stripper wells, each producing 6 barrels a day, in the Dorward Field. He took it even though the price of oil at the time was $25 a barrel, making a marginal profit, and invested in more wells and land until he had the capital to drill wells of his own. Eventually he started Unitex Oil & Gas, which by 2011 owned 150 wells producing 400 barrels a day, specializing in shallow-field plays on the eastern shelf of the Permian Basin. A year later he was named one of Forbes' 30 Under 30 in the energy sector. By 2019 Unitex employed 80 and owned 1,500 wells; the year before Wilson and his family had moved into a 6,985-square-foot (648.9 m^{2}) mansion on a 2.5-acre (1.0 ha) lot off a cul-de-sac in the northern section of Midland. He and his wife taught Sunday school at First Baptist Church where he was also a deacon.

Heidelberg, who went by his middle name Hayden with friends and family, was born and raised in Greenwood, east of Midland. He graduated from Midland High School in 2009. After his 2011 graduation from Midland College, he earned a bachelor's degree in biology from Sul Ross State University. Heidelberg then joined the city's police department, graduating from its police academy in 2014. He played guitar in a local band called Ricky and the Rhinestones and also was part of the congregation at First Baptist Church.

== Death of Heidelberg ==
At 1:16 a.m. on March 5, 2019, a silent alarm went off at the Wilson home. The alarm company notified Midland police, who in turn dispatched Heidelberg and Victoria Allee, a probationary officer he was training, to the home. Within two minutes of the alarm, the company tested it and found it was no longer reporting an alarm condition, meaning the original signal was likely a false positive. It did not advise the police of this development.

Heidelberg and Allee drove up to the house without turning on their cruiser's lights or sirens, per procedure. Finding it darkened within, they walked around. They checked a back door and found it locked. At the front the door was unlocked; when Allee opened it an alarm chime went off, followed by a voice saying "Door open". The officers immediately closed it and called for backup.

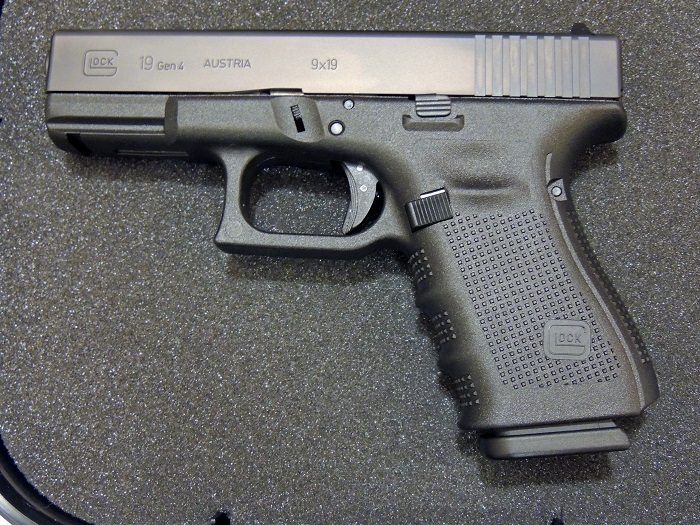
A Glock 19

The alarm awakened Wilson's wife, Amy, who in turn roused her husband. The couple went to a nearby closet, where he helped her get his Glock 19 handgun from a top shelf in the closet. Unaware that police were at the house, they saw shadows moving around outside and heard indistinct shouting, which David Wilson thought might be in Spanish. Amy Wilson went to call the police while her husband approached the front door, saying they could hear people outside and their 9-foot (2.7 m) steel front door had been kicked in. The dispatcher told her only that the police were coming.

By this time, outside the house, two additional Midland officers had arrived. While David and Amy had been getting their gun from the closet, leading the officers to report seeing shadows moving around in the house, Heidelberg opened the door again, 40 feet (12 m) away and announced once, "Midland police, come to the sound of my voice", shining his flashlight into the house. David Wilson walked up to the front door, fired one shot at the person holding the flashlight, and slammed it shut.

Amy then called 9-1-1, only to learn from the dispatcher that the police had already been at the house for some time. Her husband's bullet had struck Heidelberg in the wrist and chest, just outside the bulletproof vest he was wearing. He told another responding officer that he thought he was alright, then collapsed. Heidelberg's fellow officers administered first aid to him. Believing that the situation was too critical to wait for an ambulance, they took him in a police car to Midland Memorial Hospital, where further efforts to save him were futile. He was pronounced dead at 2:30 a.m.

== Aftermath ==
Following Heidelberg's death, police returned to the Wilson home and arrested him on a charge of second-degree manslaughter. He was released the next afternoon after posting $75,000 bond. In May he was indicted on the charge by a grand jury.

Heidelberg was the first Midland officer to die in the line of duty since 1966. Flags throughout the city were flown at half-staff. His police cruiser was parked outside police headquarters for a week while mourners left flowers. Chief Seth Herman praised him as "courageous, selfless, ethical and professional"; at Heidelberg's funeral, held at First Baptist, ending with the traditional End of Watch Call, he tearfully added "As much as I try, I will never be as good a man as Hayden." Burial was at Greenwood Cemetery.

Heidelberg was posthumously awarded the Medal of Valor by the department. Later, Governor Greg Abbott presented his family with a posthumous Star of Texas, an award given to every Texas police officer shot in the line of duty, in a ceremony at the state capitol. The section of Farm-to-Market Road 307 on which Midland police headquarters is located was named the Officer Hayden Heidelberg Memorial Highway since it connects Midland and Greenwood. At a ceremony dedicating the road and erecting signs, the department also gifted Heidelberg's now-decommissioned police cruiser to his family.

== Trial ==
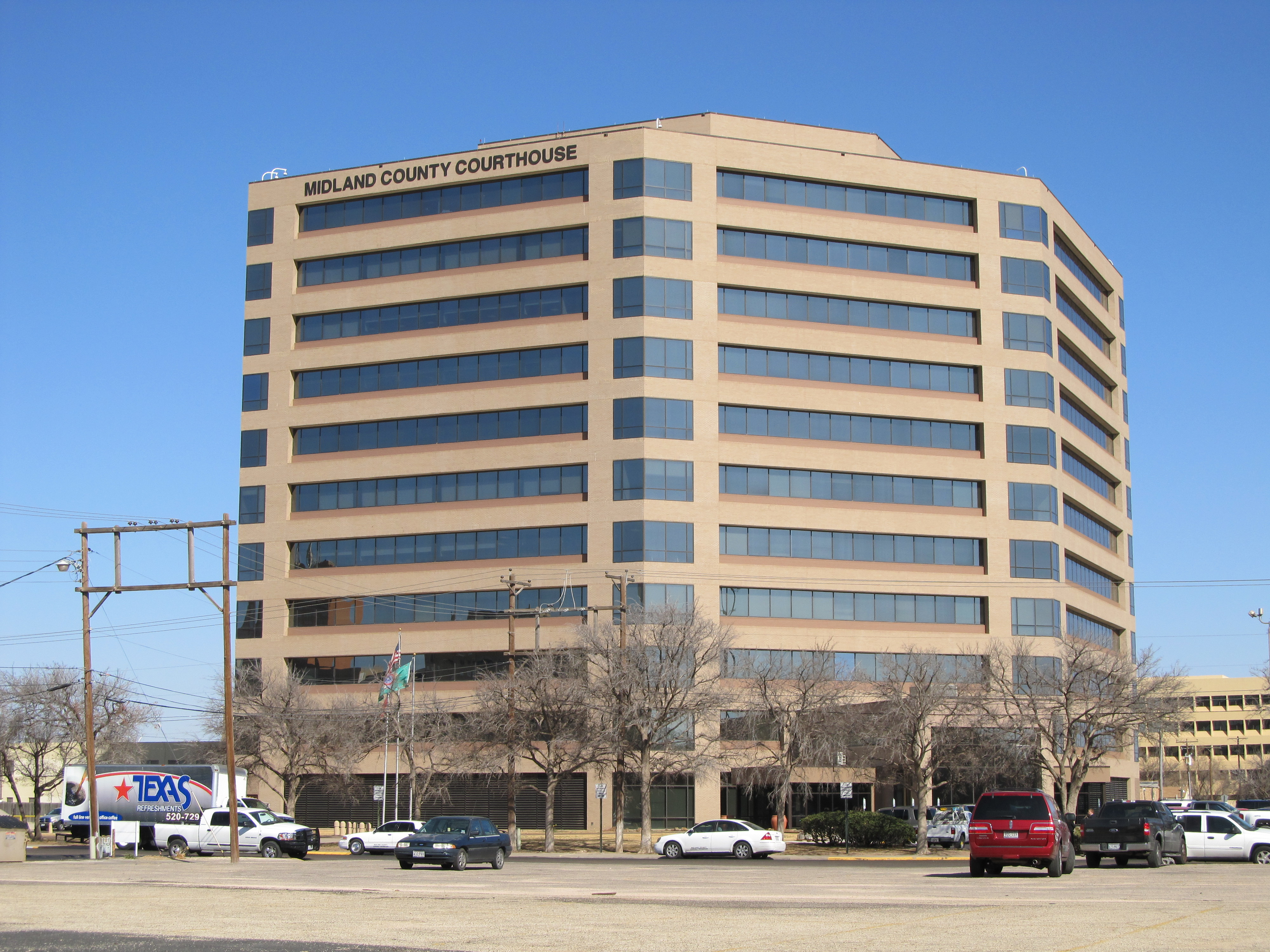
The Midland County courthouse

In late September, Wilson's legal team filed a brief in support of its motion to get the indictment dismissed. It disclosed publicly that the alarm system had been malfunctioning on the night of the shooting. Not only had there been no ongoing alarm condition, the alarm had been reported at the Wilsons' pool house, which was wired with a system separate from their main house.

The motion was denied and trial preparations continued. The beginning of the COVID-19 pandemic in 2020, a little over a year after Heidelberg's killing, delayed the trial after Abbott suspended jury trials in the state. In late October 2021, district attorney Laura Nodolf announced that she had presented the case to the grand jury a second time and secured a new indictment charging Wilson with murder, on the theory that he "was very much intentional" rather than simply reckless when he fired. "He knew he would harm or kill the person behind the flashlight", she said. When jury selection began in November 2021, with 700 people, the largest jury pool in the county's history, gathered in a courtroom to be considered for service, the pandemic again caused a two-week delay in the trial when the occasion became a superspreader event, with the judge (who had to be hospitalized) and several prospective jurors coming down with the disease.

At the end of November, the trial finally began with nine women and five men seated as jurors and alternates. Witnesses who testified to the facts of the case were primarily law enforcement personnel who had been present that night or later investigated the case, the medical personnel who treated Heidelberg, staff from the alarm monitoring company and the Wilsons themselves. Both sides also presented expert witnesses in law enforcement training and the burglar alarm system. Their testimony was augmented by an evidentiary record that included police bodycam video and footage from the security cameras inside and outside the Wilsons' house.

In opening statements, the prosecution laid out its theory that Wilson had gone to the door intent on firing and fully aware there was a person just outside. His defense lawyers countered that he reasonably believed there were intruders outside who might have meant to bring harm to his family and he meant only to protect them. They pointed to Texas's stand-your-ground law, which permits the use of deadly force in self-defense in any place the actor is lawfully present, and castle doctrine, permitting the use of deadly force to defend one's residence, both where the actor reasonably believes a threat exists.

=== Prosecution ===
After opening arguments, the state began its case-in-chief, putting Allee on the stand to recount the events that had led to the shooting. The next day, Nodolf showed the video of Wilson's interview by two Texas Rangers the day after the shooting, in which he said he had not heard Heidelberg call out that he was police, after which one of the Rangers, Cody Allen, testified about much of the documentary evidence collected at that time, including photographs of the gun and Heidelberg's uniform, as well as video montages of footage from the bodycams and the Wilson's security cameras. Heidelberg's cousin testified as to having identified the body and the county's deputy medical examiner about the cause of death.

On the third day the defense began making its arguments through cross-examination as Allen testified about the functioning of the alarm system. After he said that it had been 33 seconds between the door alarm going off and the shot firing, Wilson's lawyers asked if that was enough time for their client to have pulled up his security cameras and seen who was outside. They also emphasized the phrase "enter and die" as used in police training regarding the castle doctrine, after Allen mentioned it on the third day.

In response to a prosecution theory that Wilson could have just gathered his daughters along with his wife and hidden elsewhere in the house, the defense raised two points on cross. The first was legal: the castle doctrine abrogates the duty to retreat in one's own house. To support the second, they introduced diagrams of the house's floor plans, showing that as Wilson's daughters slept on the other side, he would have had to cross the center hallway with a clear line of sight from the front door, an action he may have judged too risky with intruders possibly already entering the house or preparing to do so.

The defense also pointed out that Allee was not interviewed until a week after the shooting, contrasting that with the relative promptness of Wilson's interview. Allen responded that it was standard practice to wait a day or two after a shooting to interview officers involved, not only to let them recover but because it is easier to get statements from officers.

Next to testify were the two officers who had responded to back Heidelberg and Allee up. The former's announcement that police were present was not audible on bodycam footage from Bailey Mims, also a probationary officer being trained in the field. She testified that it might have been obscured by the noise of her equipment as she ran to the house. On cross she said that shortly after Heidelberg's death the department changed its policy so that on alarm calls like this it would not respond unless it could be certain the verified key carrier had been contacted and was either on the location or headed there.

Her training officer, Alexander Duwel, who followed her on the stand, said he could hear Heidelberg's announcements two houses away. He also explained that alarm calls like this were very frequent occurrences while on patrol and officers were supposed to walk around the property, check doors and windows, then do a second walkaround if they saw signs of possible entry and look for evidence of a possible crime. If so they were to clear the building.

The department's dispatch communications manager testified about the call from the New Jersey–based alarm company, which was played in court. On it the employee tells the police they had not called the property owner since they were instructed to first call the police in this situation. As a result, the officers were dispatched to the residence believing someone was attempting to reach Wilson, as per department policy at the time. The defense pointed out on cross that the company's representative never said to police that they would be calling Wilson next. One of the officers who had helped get Heidelberg in the police car to go to the hospital said police on the scene had not learned for a while that the Wilsons had called 9-1-1 earlier.

After a prosecution expert witness testified about the scene as he was able to reconstruct it from the videos, which he said was more evidence than he had ever had to work with, Nodolf had the room lights dimmed and approached him pointing a flashlight and a fake gun. She asked if from his experience as a police officer he would consider that situation potentially threatening enough to fire, given a variety of distances and directions the flashlight might have been pointing. The expert believed it was pointing away from Wilson, toward the left side of the house. He also said it was possible that an action by Wilson immediately after the shooting, visible on video, might have been him trying to clear the now-jammed gun's feed so as to fire again. On cross he admitted to the defense that the glass in the door was opaque enough to make it hard to tell what kind of person was outside.

Four days of the state's case concluded with this witness, save the trauma surgeon who had attempted to treat Heidelberg at the hospital. His testimony was delayed for several days so he could recover from an illness. When he did take the stand, midway through the defense case-in-chief, he told jurors that by the time Heidelberg had been brought in he had lost a lot of blood and had no vital signs. The injury he had suffered, a transected subclavian artery, is not generally considered survivable.

After the prosecution rested, a defense motion for a directed verdict on the grounds that the state had not offered enough evidence to demonstrate that Wilson had acted out of any motive other than self-defense was denied.

=== Defense ===
The defense began its case with its own expert witness, Albert Rodriguez, who attested to his years of training law enforcement on when to use force to resolve a situation. He also stated that he had testified in many other trials on the subject, to which the prosecution objected on the grounds that most of those trials had been over officer-involved shootings rather than justifiable homicide incidents such as the instant case. After a long argument outside the presence of the jury, the judge overruled it.

On direct examination, Rodriguez testified to the typical response pattern of individuals in a situation like Wilson found himself in, mostly but not always police officers. In many instances they could not remember the incident clearly. On cross, asked by Nodolf if Wilson could reasonably have felt threatened with the flashlight pointing to his left as she believed it had been, he said that he could not state that based only on that fact.

Another law enforcement trainer, Jared Zwickey, followed Rodriguez. He endorsed every point Rodriguez had made, and noted the difference between what the officers saw and what was on the Wilsons' cameras, owing to the latters' use of infrared. Chris Russell, an alarm company owner, testified as an expert on that aspect of the case. He noted that it is very difficult for a homeowner to change the settings on their alarm system and it is usually done by the company.

Russell then went on to testify about the issues with the alarm system that led to what the defense called a "perfect storm of unfortunate consequences" which led to Heidelberg's death. When installed, the alarm system had been set to test itself daily between midnight and 1 a.m. A failure would go into a log that technicians at the alarm company would examine the next day and do whatever maintenance needed to be done.

But almost two weeks before the shooting, the alarm code had been remotely changed by the installer so that instead of just making a log entry, it would trigger an actual alarm that the monitoring company would notify local police about. Russell pointed out that while Texas requires that all operators monitoring alarms have a license to do so, in New Jersey only the company needs to be licensed. He believed licensed operators would have seen the second error code and alerted police that the system was possibly faulty and there was probably no burglary being attempted. The defense also introduced evidence that there had been two earlier incidents where alarms were reported at the Wilsons. Both times the monitoring company had attempted to contact them.

A day later, the prosecution was allowed to call Russell for part of its rebuttal case as he had to leave the area. He and Nodolf went over the 33-second time frame between when the Wilsons awoke and the shooting. Noting that the record showed an attempt to access the system after that period, she asked if it had not been possible for Wilson to have accessed the view from the cameras from his phone during that time. Russell said that he did not think that was what Wilson would have done in that situation.

The next expert defense witness was Manuel Meza-Arroyo, an industrial engineer who specialized in collision avoidance. He had prepared photographs recreating what Wilson and the responding officers might have seen that night as they approached the door from their respective positions, inside and on the front porch, as they appeared under the lighting conditions available. At the door he noted that Wilson might have perceived two lights due to a reflective table surface just outside the entrance. On cross Nodolf questioned him as to how possible it was that his recreations were not exactly what Wilson saw that night; Meza-Arroyo answered that they were the best he could do with the information he had available and that he did not think it was possible to state what Wilson may actually have seen.

A mechanical engineer, Daniel Kruger, came next, presenting computer animations of the crime scene he had made based on data Meza-Arroyo had provided him. He conceded on cross that he had never actually been to the house and derived his animations entirely from that data. Questions about the light sources available resulted in Meza-Arroyo being recalled to the stand when Kruger said his expertise did not extend to that area.

The prosecution asked Meza-Arroyo about the lights mounted on some of the palm trees in the Wilsons' front yard, which were providing illumination at the time of the shooting. Had his team considered them in assembling their recreations, they asked. Might the light from them have made Heidelberg and the police more visible than the animation and recreations suggested? Meza-Arroyo said they did not, in the same way that a light mounted on a pole a great distance away is visible, but it cannot shed light on anything that is not in its proximity.

After the break created by calling Russell to the stand for rebuttal, the defense resumed with Amy Wilson's testimony. She recounted how she had met her husband and started her family with him as his business became more and more successful, leading them to buy their house and move in. When they did, she recalled, the metal roof caused issues with not only the alarm system but many other devices in the house that relied on the Internet. She also testified to her husband's proficiency with firearms, saying that although he was not a "gun nut" he had plenty of experience handling them.

Amy then recalled the night of the shooting from her perspective. David had helped her climb up to retrieve the Glock from the closet shelf where they had placed it to prevent any of their daughters from being able to get it. The defense introduced photos showing both the extensive amount of clothes in the closet and the house's thick insulation to explain why neither of them might have been able to hear Heidelberg say "come to the sound of my voice". She explained that they had not used their phones to check the security cameras until after David fired since they were afraid the intruders might already have entered the house.

On cross, Nodolf pointed out to Amy that on direct she had admitted not hearing any voices in the house, contradicting what she told the dispatcher when calling 9-1-1. She then asked Amy to point on the diagram of the house's first floor where the speaker that announced "door open" when Allee had opened it was; Amy indicated it was on the ceiling of the main hall near her daughters' bedrooms. That, Nodolf noted, was further from the master bedroom than the front door was from the bedroom closet. Yet she had heard it clearly but claimed not to have heard Heidelberg outside.

After Amy the defense briefly put on the previous owner of the Wilsons' house. He testified that he had added the extra insulation to make the house not only warmer but quieter.

He was followed by David Wilson, who after briefly recapitulating his work history talked about the community groups he was involved with. That led to his account of the night he shot Heidelberg. He reiterated his fear for his family's safety and that he believed he was firing at an intruder, not a police officer. Wilson had offered to testify to this before the grand jury, let them visit his home and have sound testing done in his house, but, he said, none of those things had happened.

As she had with Amy, Nodolf focused on discrepancies between his recollections and the established facts. She pointed out that while he recalled seeing flashlights in use outside of the house, none of the police said any had turned theirs on until Heidelberg did. David agreed that the testimony was correct but maintained that in his mind at the time he was sure there had been lights. The two went increasingly back and forth over this until the defense loudly objected.

After Wilson agreed that there had been only two seconds at most between when Heidelberg had reopened the door and when he had announced himself as police, Nodolf questioned him at length. How fast could he have left the closet, she wanted to know. Perhaps, she said, Wilson might have been in a better position to hear Heidelberg. In his interview with the Rangers, she noted he said he had heard voices outside. Nodolf suggested that if Wilson had waited just a little longer, Heidelberg might have repeated himself and there would have been no need to shoot. Wilson said that while that might have been true, he did not think he had time to do that since there was an intruder outside.

The defense concluded its case with a series of character witnesses who had worked with Wilson in the various community groups he had been involved with. Another motion for a directed verdict was denied.

=== Verdict ===
In closing arguments, the prosecution clarified the legal issues for the jury. Nodolf reminded them that they did not all have to agree on the same theory that it was murder, just that it was murder. If they did come to that conclusion, then they had to consider whether Wilson's actions were legal self-defense. The defense followed, reiterating that legally he had the right to respond with deadly force to an apparent threat as if it were real. They also said it was shameful of the prosecution to put Heidelberg's family through the details of the killing again. In a rebuttal argument the prosecution told the jury they could best evaluate the credibility of the many witnesses by comparing their statements on the stand. Nodolf ended her arguments noting that while Heidelberg could have returned fire after being shot, he did not.

The jury retired and returned after an hour and a half with a verdict of not guilty. Nodolf told the media that while she had hoped for a different outcome, her office respected the jury's verdict. With gun laws changing rapidly, she added, the case as a whole showed how important it was in situations like the one that had given rise to it to stop and think for a second or two before pulling the trigger.

"Nobody won", said Brian Carney, Wilson's lead lawyer. "Despite the fact Mr. Wilson was acquitted, he'll be in a prison of his mind every day. Everywhere he goes, people will say, 'That's the guy that shot that cop.'"

== Public reaction ==
In the Midland area, like all of West Texas, support for both law enforcement and the right to keep and bear arms, two positions Wilson's prosecution potentially pitted against each other, is strong. The day after the verdict, callers to a local talk show on KWEL radio generally saw the whole affair as a tragedy, finding fault with neither side. "Most people are of the opinion, what a terrible thing it was—a lot of suffering on both sides here", said host Craig Anderson.

Callers agreed the right to keep firearms in the home for self-defense carried great responsibility. "If you see someone in your yard at 3 a.m. with a flashlight, don't shoot. It could be a lady looking for her dog, or a boy looking for his football, or it could be a cop", said one. "But what in the devil do you do when it's in the doorway?"

For Sara Spector, a local defense attorney and former prosecutor, the case argued against Texas's permissive self-defense laws.

I'm against stand your ground and the castle doctrine. They can lead to the unnecessary deaths of police officers, the people who are protecting us. When police are called to people's homes, it's already a highly charged situation where people's adrenaline is up and they’re not thinking straight, and no matter how well the police are trained, they know that any one of them could be shot, just like Hayden Heidelberg was, in a very tragic situation. And it will happen again, I promise you it will.

Carney similarly saw it as inevitable: "If you walk into someone's home uninvited at night in Texas, bad things happen." But to him that avoided the real issue: "If this had been anybody other than a cop, would we even be having this conversation?"

== Civil litigation ==
While the trial was pending, in 2021, both Wilson and the Heidelberg family sued the alarm installer and monitoring company, alleging its negligence had caused the prosecution and death respectively. The Heidelbergs additionally named Wilson a defendant. Wilson named two individual employees of the monitoring company as well. Both asked a million dollars in damages.

There were some slight differences in the factual accounts. Wilson's complaint claims the monitoring company's failure to notify the police that the second test of the alarm suggested a malfunction led to the police entering the house. The Heidelbergs' suit stated he was on the porch at the time of the shooting. They also pointed to the Wilsons' system of night vision cameras, suggesting as the prosecution would at the trial that he had the capability to better ascertain who was outside before shooting.

== Attempt to remove district attorney ==
In June 2022 Wilson filed a formal petition under state law to have Nodolf removed from office over alleged misconduct during the case. His complaints included:

- that Nodolf had searched the Wilson house for evidence on her own, without obtaining a warrant, the day after the shooting;
- that to secure the upgraded murder indictment, she had shown the grand jury a purported copy of a contract amendment Wilson had signed with the alarm company canceling the silent alarm notification, when in fact Wilson had never signed such an agreement;
- that she had generally abused the grand jury process in order to win the case, and
- that she had offered unsworn testimony including misstatements of material fact during the trial in the form of remarks she made about the effects of acoustic paneling inside the house.

Frank Sellers, one of the lawyers representing Wilson in the case, said there were others funding the effort as those behind felt that Wilson's case was not the only one Nodolf had behaved illegally in. A visiting judge, Kelly Moore of Lubbock, was assigned to hear the case. Two weeks later, she declined to certify the petition, ending the case since that decision could not be appealed.

== See also ==
- Deaths in 2019
- List of law enforcement officers killed in the line of duty in the United States
- Killing of Lloyd Reed, 2015 shooting of Pennsylvania police officer where shooter was also acquitted of murder charges
- Cory Maye, Mississippi man convicted in killing of police officer raiding his home
- Ryan Frederick, Virginia man convicted in killing of police officer in his home
- Killing of Jerry Waller, by Fort Worth police on his property in 2013
