= Steven Hayne =

American pathologist (born 1942)

Steven Timothy Hayne (1942-2020) was a pathologist from the US state of Mississippi who attracted significant controversy surrounding his medical practices and testimony in criminal trials, most notably those of Cory Maye, Jimmie Duncan, and Tyler Edmonds.

== Biography ==
Hayne was born in Los Angeles, California. It is unknown when he adopted the use of the last name Hayne. He graduated from Oakland Technical High School in 1959 and from Brown Medical School in 1974. He interned until 1976 at Letterman Army Medical Center in San Francisco, California. After finishing his internship, he practiced medicine in California, Kentucky, and Alabama, before settling in Mississippi in 1987.

== Practice in Mississippi ==
Until 2008, Hayne performed about 80 to 90 percent of criminal autopsies in Mississippi, even though he was never certified to do so. He testified to performing more than 1,500 autopsies per year, seven times the recommendation and considered a "Phase II deficiency" by the National Association of Medical Examiners, preventing the office from gaining accreditation. While performing these autopsies, Hayne also regularly appeared in court to testify as a forensic expert, and held down two hospital jobs. In August 2008 he was terminated from his medical examiner position and was barred from performing procedures for Mississippi. The Innocence Project was responsible for identifying Hayne's misconduct and his use of state laboratories for flawed and botched autopsies.

=== Cory Maye case ===
Hayne was the medical examiner in the Cory Maye case and testified at the trial for the murder of Ron Jones. In this testimony, "Hayne said he could tell from the damage to Jones’ body the trajectory the bullet took as it entered the officer. Based on that trajectory, he speculated that Maye was standing when he shot Jones, not lying on the floor, as Maye testified. Hayne's testimony seriously damaged Maye's credibility with the jury. However, according to a post-trial review by an actual, board-certified forensics expert whom Maye's new legal team hired, it would be impossible to project the bullet's trajectory based on the tissue damage in Jones’ corpse, because Jones might have been crouching, rolling, or prone when he was hit."

=== Jimmie Duncan case ===
Jimmie Duncan was convicted for the 1993 murder of Haley Oliveaux of West Monroe, Louisiana based primarily on the testimony of Hayne and Michael West, a dentist who claimed to identify bite marks and at the time coroner of Forrest County, Mississippi. Duncan had admitted to leaving Oliveaux in a bathtub unattended, and was initially charged with negligent homicide. Hayne examined Oliveaux and claimed to have found bite marks on her face that had not been seen by any of the other medical professionals who had previously examined her body, such as EMTs and hospital personnel. After this, a mold was taken of Duncan's teeth for use in bite mark analysis by Michael West. In performing this analysis, West repeatedly pressed the mold into the cheek of Oliveaux' corpse, creating bite marks which had not previously existed. This was recorded on videotape which surfaced in 2008. Michael Bowers, deputy medical examiner for Ventura County, California commented with regard to the bite marks that "Dr. West created them. It was intentional. He's creating artificial abrasions in that video, and he's tampering with the evidence. It's criminal, regardless of what excuse he may come up with about his methods."

=== Tyler Edmonds case ===
In 2004, 14-year-old Tyler Edmonds was tried and convicted for the murder of his brother-in-law, Joey Fulgham, which had occurred the previous year. The murder had in fact been committed by Kristi Fulgham, Joey Fulgham's wife and Edmonds' half-sister, who had persuaded Edmonds to take the blame by claiming his age (13 at the time of the killing) meant that he wouldn't be charged. Testifying for the prosecution, Hayne claimed to have determined from the bullet wounds received by Joey Fulgham that both Edmonds and Kristi Fulgham had been holding the gun at the time the trigger was pulled. On appeal to the Mississippi Supreme Court, this testimony was called "speculative" and "scientifically unfounded", resulting in Edmonds' conviction being overturned. A retrial in 2008, which excluded Hayne's testimony, saw Edmonds acquitted.

Hayne's involvement in the wrongful convictions of Levon Brooks and Kennedy Brewer was documented in the book The Cadaver King and the Country Dentist by journalist Radley Balko.
