= List of killings by law enforcement officers in the United States, May 2013 =

This is a list of people reported killed by non-military law enforcement officers in the United States in May 2013, whether in the line of duty or not, and regardless of reason or method. The listing documents the occurrence of a death, making no implications regarding wrongdoing or justification on the part of the person killed or officer involved. Killings are arranged by date of the incident that caused death. Different death dates, if known, are noted in the description. The table below lists 102 people.

== May 2013 ==
Date	Name (Age) of Deceased	Rac	State (City)	Description
2013-05-31	Ernest Zaus Jaquine Barnett (30)	Black	Georgia (Atlanta)	
2013-05-31	Michael Neal Peters (54)	White	North Carolina (Broad Creek)	
2013-05-30	Gerardo Diego Ayala (26)	Hispanic	California (Santa Ana)	Officers suspected four men of suspicious activity and approached them. A fight ensued between an officer and one man, and the officer shot and killed the man. The other three men fled, and officers pursued them by vehicle. The chase ended when the men crashed, killing a pedestrian.
2013-05-30	Joseph Moreno (24)	Hispanic	Arizona (Mesa)	
2013-05-29	Kyree Johnson (22)	Black	Pennsylvania (Philadelphia)	
2013-05-29	Harper, Douglas (62)	White	Montana (Helena)	62-year-old Douglas Harper was shot and killed by a deputy who was conducting a welfare check. Harper pointed a handgun at the deputy and failed to comply with orders to drop his weapon, and the deputy fired his handgun as a result.
2013-05-29	Peters, Bernard Jr.	Black	California (Oakland)	An unarmed man was shot multiple times by officers in an incident that began as a vehicle chase.
2013-05-29	Scott, Mhai (38)	Asian	Virginia (Sterling)	Two deputies were responding to a disorderly conduct complaint in a Costco store. Officers say Mhai advanced on them with a knife and scissors. They first used a stun gun and then fired several shots, killing her.
2013-05-29	McRae, Nathaniel (34)	Black	Washington D.C.	McRae was killed in an alleged exchange of gunfire with officers who were pursuing him as a suspect in a carjacking.
2013-05-28	Waller, Jerry (72)	White	Texas (Fort Worth)	Officers were responding to a burglary alarm when they encountered Waller armed with a gun in his garage across the street from where the alarm was sounding. Feeling threatened, at least one officer shot Waller multiple times, killing him.
2013-05-28	Angela Darlene Smith (37)	White	Tennessee (Crossville)	
2013-05-27	William Dupree (32)	Black	Missouri (St. Louis)	
2013-05-26	Esteban J. Smith (23)	Hispanic	Texas (Eden)	
2013-05-26	Theodore Dennis Vanosdall (36)	White	Colorado (Salida)	A man was killed after allegedly firing at officers who arrived at a home in response to a disturbance call.
2013-05-26	Cruz, Samuel (48)	Hispanic	New York (New Rochelle)	Police responded to a report of an emotionally disturbed man who wouldn't let a relative into his apartment. When the man refused officers' attempts to talk him out, they first tasered him and then shot him when he allegedly lunged at officers with a knife.
2013-05-26	Anthony Galla (32)	White	Pennsylvania (Upper Darby)	
2013-05-25	Gary Hatcher (26)	Black	Michigan (Mt. Morris Township)	
2013-05-25	Toretti, John (42)	White	California (Sacramento)	Police were called when a man frightened a Metro PCS employee with "intelligible(sic) statements." A struggle ensued with the officers, and the man was pepper-sprayed, kicked, and repeatedly beaten with batons. Officers noticed he had stopped breathing once he was in police custody.
2013-05-25	unnamed male (23)	Unknown	Pennsylvania (Philadelphia)	Police were responding to a report of a man in the middle of the street holding a knife. They used their vehicle to knock him down and then pepper-sprayed him. He then ran toward them, and they shot and killed him.
2013-05-25	Mitchell, Ajani (21)	Black	South Carolina (Columbia)	Mitchell was shot by officers who felt threatened when he refused to drop a gun he was holding. Police had been called by Mitchell's grandmother.
2013-05-25	Foote, Jeff (39)	White	Utah (Washington Terrace)	Foote was killed by officers after allegedly firing a shot at them with a small handgun he was brandishing in his parents' front yard. He was threatening to shoot himself.
2013-05-24	Tovar, Adolpho Vargas (47)	Hispanic	California (San Diego)	Tovar was fatally shot by officers after he drove a car in reverse towards them. He had allegedly robbed a nearby gas station.
2013-05-24	Valluzzo, John (75)	White	Connecticut (Ridgefield)	Police were responding to a domestic incident when an officer shot and killed Valluzzo, head of the Military Museum in Southern New England. Police say an officer fired on Valluzzo after he allegedly refused to drop a weapon and raised the weapon at police.
2013-05-24	Hilger, Thomas (49)	White	Montana (Worden)	Hilger was killed by sheriff's deputies Martin Stuart and Tony Watson behind the bar he owned. Police were responding to a report of suspicious activity and questioned Hilger, who allegedly pulled out a gun. Investigators later found Hilger's girlfriend's body in a vehicle.
2013-05-24	Thomas, Leonard (30)	Black	Washington (Fife)	Mr. Thomas was drunk and despondent due to the recent death of a close friend. His mother called police, who summoned a SWAT team when Thomas refused to come out of the house. After a four-hour standoff, Thomas agreed to send his 4-year-old son home with his mother, and he and the boy were standing on the front porch getting ready to send the boy down the sidewalk to his grandmother. Around the same time as this pending resolution, the SWAT team used explosives to blow open the back door and Thomas reacted by grabbing the boy. Sniper Brian Markert then fatally shot Thomas from across the street. Other SWAT team members also fatally shot a dog.
2013-05-23	Rayshawn Marquis Brown (27)	Black	California (Compton)	
2013-05-23	Theodule LeJeune Jr. (58)	Unknown race	Alaska (Sutton-Alpine)	
2013-05-23	Thomas Bean (43)	Black	Ohio (Toledo)	
2013-05-23	Jackson Alexandre (28)	Unknown race	New York (New York)	
2013-05-22	Julian Dawkins (22)	Black	Virginia (Alexandria)	
2013-05-22	Belton "Amir" Lomax (35)	Black	Pennsylvania (Philadelphia)	
2013-05-22	Todashev, Ibragim (27)	White	Florida (Orlando)	Ibragim Todashev interview and death
2013-05-21	William Alexander Mejia (18)	Hispanic	California (Los Angeles)	
2013-05-20	Randy Scott Moore (56)	White	Texas (Three Way)	
2013-05-20	Jose SiFuentes (28)	Hispanic	Texas (Longview)	
2013-05-20	Joshua "Omar" Johnson (22)	Black	Virginia (Norfolk)	
2013-05-20	Alan James Stokes (22)	White	Texas (Clifton)	
2013-05-20	Anthony Michael Bland (26)	Black	Virginia (Williamsburg)	
2013-05-19	Ernesto Gonzalez (29)	Hispanic	Texas (Eden)	
2013-05-19	Labaki, Naim "Keith" (43)	White	Wyoming (Evanston)	Labaki was shot after allegedly pointing a rifle at an officer from inside a vehicle. Labaki had allegedly fired one shot outside a home and another into a store earlier that day and was fleeing in an SUV when he lost control and was rear-ended by an unmarked police vehicle.
2013-05-18	Laffitte, Terry (50)	Black	California (Los Angeles)	Police say officers saw Laffitte riding a bicycle while intoxicated and holding a handgun. They confronted him, and a struggle ensued in a driveway. Officers shot and killed Laffitte when he allegedly pulled a gun from his waistband. Multiple witnesses say that Laffitte was unarmed. Police say they recovered a revolver at the scene.
2013-05-18	Terrence Dawson (30)	Black	Arkansas (Blytheville)	
2013-05-18	Charles Curl (46)	Black	California (Inglewood)	
2013-05-17	Guillermo Pablo Cedano (44)	Hispanic	California (Montebello)	
2013-05-17	Smith, Dalton (30)	Black	New York (Mineola)	Andrea Robello was at home with three other people when Dalton Smith, wearing a ski mask, entered and demanded valuables. He allowed one woman to leave to withdraw money from an ATM, and she called the police. Officers arrived and found Smith with Robello in a headlock, holding a gun to her head. Smith allegedly threatened the officers who fired eight shots, hitting Smith seven times and Robello once in the head. Both were killed.
2013-05-17	Robello, Andrea (21)	Hispanic	New York (Mineola)	Andrea Robello was at home with three other people when Dalton Smith, wearing a ski mask, entered and demanded valuables. He allowed one woman to leave to withdraw money from an ATM, and she called the police. Officers arrived and found Smith with Robello in a headlock, holding a gun to her head. Smith allegedly threatened the officers who fired eight shots, hitting Smith seven times and Robello once in the head. Both were killed.
2013-05-17	Brozek, Brent E. (43)	White	Wisconsin (Madison)	Brozek was shot and killed by Officers Ryan Finnegan, Ryan Orvis, and Scott Templeton after allegedly charging at them with a sword. Police say bean bag rounds were fired first. The shooting concluded a day-long standoff that began when sheriff's deputies tried to evict Brozek from his condo.
2013-05-17	Khan Tony Nim (35)	Asian	California (Alhambra)	
2013-05-17	Misty Michelle Mullins (33)	White	North Carolina (Raleigh)	
2013-05-16	Cairns, Justin (21)	White	Washington (Nine Mile Falls)	Mr. Cairns was a suspect in the killing of another man earlier in the day when officers tracked him to a house, confronted him, and he allegedly ignored their unspecified commands.
2013-05-16	Darden, Jermaine (34)	Black	Texas (Fort Worth)	Darden, a 300-pound man with breathing problems, died after being tased multiple times during a drug raid. Police say he resisted them, while his mother, who witnessed the incident, said he was trying to lie on his side because lying on his stomach made him unable to breathe.
2013-05-16	Blackburn, Caleb Wade (33)	White	California (Oildale)	Kern County Sheriff deputies, investigating a stabbing, were directed to Blackburn inside an apartment in Oildale. When they entered the apartment and confronted Blackburn, he was shot at least once by a deputy. Blackburn died at a local hospital.
2013-05-16	Freddy Batt Sosa (22)	Hispanic	Arizona (Tucson)	
2013-05-16	James Genda (64)	White	Ohio (Akron)	
2013-05-16	Christian Leonard Eaddy (25)	Black	California (Los Angeles)	
2013-05-15	Kourtney Hahn (21)	Black	Ohio (Clintonville)	
2013-05-15	Emmanuel Gatewood (24)	Black	Ohio (Clintonville)	
2013-05-15	Louis M. Squires (44)	Black	Massachusetts (Springfield)	
2013-05-15	Jesus Espinosa (52)	Hispanic	Connecticut (Hartford)	
2013-05-14	Driggers, Bobby (50)	White	Florida (Brandon)	
2013-05-14	Ignacio Ochoa (37)	Hispanic	California (Paramount)	
2013-05-14	Christopher Dubois (39)	White	Colorado (Denver)	Police say a suicidal man was holding a gun to his head in the middle of a street. Officers killed him after he allegedly threatened a firefighter.
2013-05-13	Rodney Oneil Pike (38)	White	Georgia (Buford)	
2013-05-12	Andrew P. Bush (29)	White	Missouri (Oakville)	
2013-05-12	Gerald "Skip" Tyrone Murphy (38)	Black	New Jersey (Trenton)	
2013-05-12	Jenny Lynn Borelis (28)	White	Washington (Kelso)	
2013-05-11	Nathan D. Brokaw (28)	White	Nebraska (Stromsburg)	
2013-05-11	Rigoberto Arceo (34)	Hispanic	California (Cudahy)	Shot and killed by Los Angeles County Sheriff’s Deputy L Mendoza while returning home from a Mother's Day party. Mendoza had ordered Arceo to the ground, who, with his hands raised in the air, was telling Deputy Mendoza that he did not have to do anything, when the deputy shot him once in the chest. In an attempt to justify the shooting, Deputy Mendoza claimed that Arceo was trying to grab his gun. However, eyewitnesses who saw the shooting describe Arceo as having his hands raised over his head when he was shot and that he was approximately 10 feet away from the deputy when the deputy shot and killed him.
2013-05-10	Ivan Romero (24)	Unknown	Minnesota (Minneapolis)	An officer, responding to the shooting involving Terrance Franklin, ran a red light and struck Romero's motorcycle, killing him and injuring his passenger.
2013-05-10	Tony Starnes (45)	Unknown race	Illinois (Richmond)	
2013-05-10	Candace Jackson (38)	White	Texas (Longview)	
2013-05-10	Terrance Franklin (22)	Black	Minnesota (Minneapolis)	Franklin, a burglary suspect, was cornered in a basement by officers after fleeing police. A struggle ensued between Franklin and at least five officers and one K9, during which Franklin allegedly pulled the trigger on Officer Mark Durand's gun, shooting Officers Michael Meath and Ricardo Muro in the leg. An unidentified undercover officer shot Franklin multiple times, killing him.
2013-05-10	William McKnight (43)	Unknown race	Indiana (Plainfield)	
2013-05-10	Jose Garcia (49)	Hispanic	Missouri (Eureka)	
2013-05-10	Charles Burns (21)	White	California (Antioch)	
2013-05-09	Alberto F. Valdes (58)	Hispanic	Florida (Lake City)	
2013-05-09	unnamed male (21)	Unknown	Pennsylvania (Philadelphia)	Police killed a man when he allegedly pulled out a gun while they were pursuing him for an unspecified reason.
2013-05-09	Bryan Snyder Valle (19)	Unknown race	California (San Bernardino)	
2013-05-08	Thomas Edward Pulst (29)	White	Montana (Great Falls)	
2013-05-08	unnamed person	Unknown race	Florida (Miami)	
2013-05-08	Silva, David Sal (33)	White	California (Bakersfield)	Silva was repeatedly beaten by several officers with batons as well as bitten by a K9 dog in front of multiple witnesses. He was intoxicated, and officers say they were attempting to subdue him after he resisted arrest. A coroner listed the primary cause of death as hypertensive heart disease and ruled the killing as accidental. Kern County, in May 2016, agreed to pay $3.4 million to settle a wrongful death lawsuit by Silva's family
2013-05-08	Valdes, Danny (30)	Hispanic	Florida (Miami)	
2013-05-08	Armstrong, Clifton (38)	Black	Oklahoma (Oklahoma City)	Armstrong died after being restrained by police in front of his mother's home. Armstrong, who suffered from drug abuse, according to family, had called the police to report that his family was trying to kill him.
2013-05-08	Marlon Brown (38)	Black	Florida (DeLand)	Marlon Brown was being chased by DeLand police because they allegedly saw that he was not wearing a seatbelt. After abandoning his car in a dead-end road, he started to run on foot on a vegetable garden. Rookie DeLand police officer James Harris would then continue chasing Brown in his police car until Brown stumbles and falls, and would subsequently be run over by Officer Harris, killing Brown by mechanical asphyxia. Officer Harris would be subsequently terminated from his probationary officer status after the incident occurred but was not indicted in charges of manslaughter brought on by Brown's family. Krystle Brown, Brown's wife, reached a $550,000 settlement with the city of DeLand in August.
2013-05-07	Carlos Domingo Oquendo (23)	Hispanic	Florida (Leesburg)	
2013-05-07	Kendra Diggs (37)	Black	Maryland (Baltimore)	
2013-05-06	Saeteurn, Saan Pao (32)	Asian	California (Suisun City)	Saan Pao Saeteurn was shot and killed by police after brandishing a pellet gun at them. The pellet gun was designed to look like an authentic rifle.
2013-05-05	Deion Fludd (17)	Black	New York (New York)	
2013-05-05	Tywon Jones (16)	Black	Illinois (Chicago)	
2013-05-04	David Adam Patrick Maher (30)	White	Oklahoma (Stringtown)	
2013-05-04	Pedro Martinez Campos (29)	Hispanic	California (Escondido)	
2013-05-04	Frito Valcin (38)	Black	Florida (Miami)	
2013-05-04	Marquis James Spencer (21)	Black	Florida (Orlando)	
2013-05-03	Josiah M. Fischer (27)	White	Oregon (Warren)	
2013-05-02	Ryan Koontz (22)	Black	Indiana (Fort Wayne)	
2012-05-02	Jamie Coyle (35)	White	Rhode Island (Pawtucket)	
2013-05-02	Julio Colon (40)	Hispanic	New York (Schenectady)	
2013-05-01	Jordan Burnell West-Morson (26)	Black	Michigan (Detroit)	
2013-05-01	Omar Marchabeyoglu (54)	White	Texas (San Leon)	
2013-05-01	Lawrence Edward Graham III (20)	Black	North Carolina (Fayetteville)	
2013-05-01	Kenneth Bernard Williams (55)	Black	California (Los Angeles)	
2013-05-01	Christopher Lane Nash (59)	Unknown race	Texas (Paris)	Nash was shot during a confrontation with Paris law enforcement officers at a convenience store on Church Street. It occurred during a joint investigation by the Paris Police Department and Lamar County Sheriff’s Office into a large amount of illicit drugs being delivered to the Paris area. He was taken to Paris Regional Medical Center, where he subsequently died from his injuries.

== See also ==
- Death in custody § United States
- Henry A. Wallace Police Crime Public Database
- List of cases of police brutality
- List of countries with annual rates and counts for killings by law enforcement officers
- List of law enforcement officers killed in the line of duty in the United States
- List of law enforcement officers convicted for an on-duty killing in the United States
- List of shootings by US immigration agents
- List of police reforms related to the George Floyd protests
- List of unarmed African Americans killed by law enforcement officers in the United States
- Lists of killings by law enforcement officers
- Police brutality in the United States
- Police misconduct § United States
- Police riot § United States
- Police use of deadly force in the United States
