= Cory Maye =

American former prisoner (born 1980)

Cory Jermaine Maye (born September 9, 1980) is a former prisoner. He was originally convicted of murder in the 2001 death of Prentiss, Mississippi, police officer Ron W. Jones, during a drug raid on the other half of Maye's duplex.

Maye has said he thought that the intruders were burglars and did not realize they were police. He pleaded not guilty at his trial, citing self-defense. Nevertheless, Maye was convicted of murder and was sentenced to death. The case attracted little attention until late 2005, when Reason magazine senior editor and police misconduct researcher Radley Balko brought it to light on his blog The Agitator.

Balko's research raised several questions about Maye's conviction and in particular about the reliability of medical examiner Steven Hayne, who performed the autopsy on Jones and testified at the trial. According to Maye's supporters, his conviction also brought up issues such as the right to self-defense, police conduct in the war on drugs, racial and social inequities in Mississippi and whether he received competent legal representation.

On September 21, 2006, Maye's death sentence was unexpectedly overturned by Judge Michael Eubanks, who ruled that Maye had received incompetent legal representation during his sentencing phase, and ordered a new sentencing hearing. Maye was sentenced to life in prison. On November 17, 2009, the Mississippi Court of Appeals ruled that Maye's constitutional right of vicinage was violated when Judge Eubanks refused to return the case to Jefferson Davis County, where the alleged crime occurred. The en banc court reversed Maye's conviction and remanded the case for a new trial. The State of Mississippi appealed to the Mississippi Supreme Court, which agreed to hear the case. On December 2, 2010, the Mississippi Supreme Court issued its decision, in which it held that Maye was entitled to a new trial on the ground that the trial court had improperly refused to issue a self-defense instruction that would have highlighted for the jury Maye's right to act in defense of his infant daughter, who was present in the home on the night of the police raid that led to the shooting.

On July 1, 2011, Judge Prentiss Harrell signed a plea agreement in which Maye pleaded guilty to manslaughter; Maye was then sentenced to ten years in prison, time he had already served. Maye was transferred to Rankin County, Mississippi for procedural paperwork and out-processing and was released on July 18, 2011.

== Death of Officer Jones ==
At 11 p.m. on the night of December 26, 2001, Ron Jones along with other police officers and an agent employed by the Pearl River Basin Narcotics Task Force, a four-county police agency responsible for drug enforcement, went to Maye's duplex for the purpose of drug interdiction. Jones, though not a member of the task force, had received a confidential tip that large quantities of marijuana were being stored and sold in the apartment of Jamie Smith, who lived in the other half of the duplex. The officers obtained search warrants for both apartments. Whether the warrants legally allowed for a no-knock entry is still not clear.

Smith was arrested without incident. Although some illicit drugs were found in his home, Maye's former attorney, Rhonda Cooper, says Smith was never charged with drug possession or distribution. They found a little more than a gram of marijuana, most of it old and ashen—at worst a misdemeanor. Jefferson Davis County District Attorney Claiborne "Buddy" McDonald says he does not remember Smith being charged or convicted.

There is disagreement about what happened next. The officers then either served the warrant on Maye's half of the duplex (prosecutors would later say that both were served simultaneously) or entered what they thought was another door to Smith's in search of more contraband.

Four of the officers who took part in the raid testified they knocked on Maye's door and identified themselves as law enforcement officers. Maye testified he heard neither knocks on his door nor anyone announce themselves. Maye testified he was asleep on a chair in the living room when he heard a crash, prompting him to run to his daughter's bedroom and ready a .380 caliber pistol that he kept boxed and unloaded on top of a tall headboard. When Jones entered the bedroom, Maye fired three times. Jones was wearing a bulletproof vest, but one bullet hit just below the vest, and the injury proved fatal.

Jones, the son of Prentiss' then police chief, was not a regular member of the narcotics task force, but a K9 officer for the Prentiss police department. Trial testimony showed that when Jones exited the apartment and fell to the ground outside, his pistol was holstered.

== Trial ==
The trial was held in neighboring Marion County, after Maye's lawyer successfully argued for a change of venue. But his lawyer's original request and agreement for the venue change had been to Lamar County, an adjoining county that is 88% white. When she belatedly realized her error, Maye's trial lawyer tried unsuccessfully to have the trial moved back to Jefferson Davis County. Although the trial judge refused the request to return the trial to Jefferson Davis County, he did again change the venue to Marion County where the trial was subsequently held. Of the 12 jurors subsequently selected, two were African American.

Maye testified that it was dark in his apartment when he heard someone breaking into the back door, which was located in the bedroom. "That's when I fired the shots," Maye said. "After I fired the shots, I heard them yell 'police! police!' Once I heard them, I put the weapon down and slid it away. I did not know they were police officers."

The weapon used was stolen approximately one year prior to the shooting. Maye claims it was given to him by a friend. The prosecution claimed that officers announced at the front door and then at the back door of Maye's residence. He and his lawyer say that they only identified themselves as police after he had shot Jones. The defense tried to show Maye did not know the persons breaking in were police officers, and that he was acting to protect his infant daughter in the bedroom. In mitigation the defense argued Maye's lack of a criminal record and his young age (21).

The jury took five hours to convict Maye on the capital murder charge. The same afternoon, Marion County Circuit Court Judge Michael Eubanks sentenced Maye to death by lethal injection.

== Incarceration ==
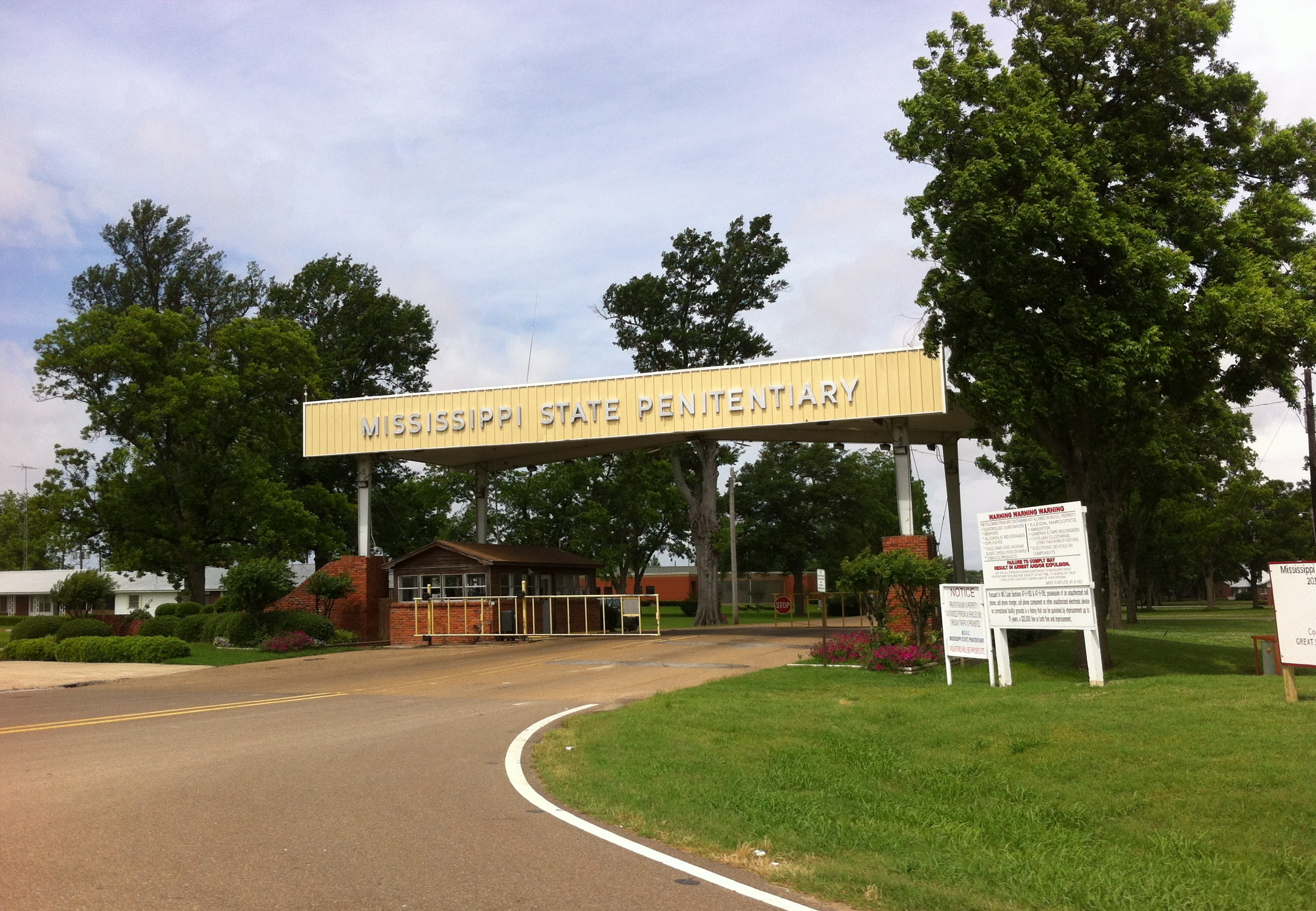
Maye was imprisoned in the Mississippi State Penitentiary

Maye entered MDOC on January 26, 2004. He was incarcerated in the State of Mississippi's male death row in Unit 32, a part of the Mississippi State Penitentiary in Sunflower County, and later in the Delta Correctional Facility in Greenwood, Mississippi.

=== Discrepancies in police and court records ===
Since Jones died, it is impossible to know how thoroughly he investigated the tip he received before passing it along. He claimed he had observed unusually heavy traffic at the residence, but left no written record of when he made those observations (important since Maye had only moved into the apartment a few weeks before the raid). The credibility of the informant is not known beyond Jones' statement that information he had previously provided had led to a single arrest. It also appears that Jones and a colleague did not verify the tip, which is typically done by making a controlled drug buy.

Jones' affidavit for the warrants names Smith but not Maye, referring only to "person or persons unknown" in the other apartment. Both apartments are described using the same language.

Times have been changed on official records of when evidence was collected from both apartments. Characteristically for what was initially a major drug arrest, Smith's apartment was swept immediately afterwards. However, several changes made to the documents for Maye put the time of that evidence collection at 5:20 a.m., several hours after the raid.

Maye's family and his attorney also accused officers of beating him while he was in custody after his arrest. His mug shot, taken the day of the shooting, shows Maye with a prominent swollen and discolored right eye. Officers and prosecutors denied that any beating occurred.

== Appeal ==
Maye's appeal was argued before the Mississippi Court of Appeals on June 4, 2009; on November 17, 2009, the court set aside his conviction and ordered a new trial on the grounds that he was denied his right to have the trial conducted in the county of the alleged crime.

On June 24, 2010, the Mississippi Supreme Court granted petitions for writ of certiorari filed by both the State of Mississippi (arguing that the Court of Appeals' decision to grant Maye a new trial was erroneous) and Maye (arguing that the Court of Appeals erred in not vacating his conviction entirely and dismissing the charges for insufficient evidence, and advancing alternative grounds for a new trial). On December 2, 2010, the Mississippi Supreme Court vacated the Court of Appeals' decision and granted Maye a new trial on the grounds that the trial court erred in refusing to instruct the jury as Maye had requested on the nature of self-defense and defense of others (i.e., his daughter).

== Plea agreement ==
On the morning of July 1, 2011, Maye was offered and accepted a plea agreement. Judge Prentiss Harrell of the 15th Circuit Court of Mississippi signed the agreement under which Maye pleaded guilty to manslaughter in exchange for a ten-year sentence, which was decreed to be time served. Maye was then transferred to Rankin County, Mississippi for procedural paperwork and out-processing, and was released on July 18, 2011.

== Media coverage ==
- Railroaded Onto Death Row?
- Radley Balko Interviewed About Cory Maye On Charles Goyette Show - Air America Radio Phoenix, Arizona.

== Internet coverage ==
- Radley Balko blog entries
- Blog entry by William Norman Grigg
- Waiting for Death in Mississippi at TalkLeft.com (a blog). Accessed December 9, 2005.
- Mississippi Appellate Court Video Archive

== Legal documents ==
- Search warrant for Maye residence
- Affidavit for Maye search
- Underlying evidence for Maye affidavit
- Evidence report from the Maye search
- Search warrant for the Smith residence
- Affidavit for the Smith search
- Underlying evidence for the Smith affidavit
- Evidence report from the Smith search

== See also ==
- Steven Hayne
- Ryan Frederick
- Killing of Nathan Heidelberg (2019 death of Texas police officer in which homeowner was acquitted of all charges)
