= Killing of Jerry Waller =

2013 death in Fort Worth, Texas, United States

- Date: May 28, 2013
- Time: 1:06 a.m. (CDT)
- Location: Woodhaven, Fort Worth, Texas, United States; 32.7723°N 97.2306°W
- Type: Police killing
- Motive: Self-defense
- Outcome: No charges filed
- Deaths: 1
- Litigation: Waller v. City of Fort Worth, Waller v. Hanlon and Waller v. Hoeppner

In the early morning hours of May 28, 2013, Jerry Waller (born October 23, 1940) heard possible trespassers outside his house in a suburban neighborhood of Fort Worth, Texas, United States. When he went outside to investigate, carrying his handgun, he encountered two police officers, one of whom shot and killed him. No criminal charges were brought after the officers were cleared of wrongdoing; while the city was found not to be liable in civil litigation, suits against the officers involved have continued.

The officers, both in their first year on the job, had been responding to a report of a burglar alarm being triggered at a neighboring residence. Due to the poor lighting conditions, they went to the wrong house, Waller's, and did not turn their flashlights on to verify the address as they had walked across the yard of another neighboring house in order to avoid alerting any intruder on the property to their approach. Seeing it was dark, they believed it unoccupied, and patrolled around the perimeter, where they encountered Waller outside the house near the opened garage.

Waller's family has challenged the officers' version of events, noting the two give different accounts of how far away the officer who fired was at the time, and how Waller was holding his gun. The family says Waller was inside the garage when he was shot. They also point to the autopsy report, which shows wounds to Waller's hand that they say are inconsistent with him having a gun in it at the time they were inflicted. Courts have held that it is a genuine question of fact as to whether Waller was armed when fired on; if it were found that he was not, the officers would not be entitled to qualified immunity.

== Background ==
Jerry Waller was born in 1940 in Fort Worth to a minister and his wife. After graduating from Brewer High School in the city, he served in the military, marrying Kathleen Bergin in 1968 while he was in Officer Candidate School during his service in the Oklahoma National Guard. The couple raised two children. After returning to civilian life, he started two small businesses, a tire company and small farm, both of which he was still involved with at the time of his death.

== Incident ==
May 27, 2013, was Memorial Day, the end of a three-day holiday weekend. The Wallers had cooked a barbecue meal outside that day in their home abutting a golf course in eastern Fort Worth's Woodhaven neighborhood. At 11 p.m. they went to bed for the night. Kathy made sure the garage door, open during the day as they cooked on the patio, was closed and locked.

Almost two hours later, about 12:45 a.m. May 28, a neighbor who lived across the street from the Wallers, who was recovering from recent surgery and was chronically ill, was showing her home care aide how to set her burglar alarm. In the process she triggered it; neither she nor the aide could turn it off. The alarm company, ADT, was notified and attempted to call, but only reached the neighbor's answering machine. ADT called another neighbor who told them the woman next door was sick and suggested sending police to check on the situation.

ADT's representative called the Fort Worth Police Department (FWPD), who dispatched officers Benjamin Hanlon and Richard Hoeppner at 12:52 a.m. The two were probationary officers in their first year in law enforcement; they had started with the department in February after three months of supervised field training. They were working the night shift since officers were allowed to choose their shifts based on seniority and all the positions on the day and evening shifts had been taken by those with more time on the job. They had just finished working a call together. Driving separate patrol cars, they parked in front of the house next to the Wallers just before 1 a.m. and joined each other on foot for the wellness check.

The officers had not verified the address with their cars' GPS units. Later, Hanlon and Hoeppner told investigators that they assumed that the house they had parked in front of was adjacent to the one they had been dispatched to, unaware, they told investigators later, that odd- and even-numbered houses were on different sides of the street. Seeing the house they believed they had been dispatched to was dark, they considered the possibility they were coming upon a burglary in progress and decided to approach without putting their flashlights on out of concern for their safety.

In the house, Kathy Waller was awakened by the couple's dogs barking, and lights flashing in their backyard. She asked her husband to get up and look outside. Believing it was most likely a false alarm from the Wallers' car, which had happened before, he put on jeans, picked up his five-shot .38-caliber snubnosed revolver and headed out through the garage door.

Hanlon and Hoeppner at first went into the backyard, where they believed a burglar might have broken in or attempted to, as it was not visible from the street. They noted a car—Waller's—at the very back of the driveway's carport, not visible from the street, and considered the possibility that it might be a burglar's getaway car since it was out of sight. As the backyard was unlit, they shone their flashlights around searching for any sign of a burglar or a break-in.

They spent several minutes looking around the house, both of them in the backyard before deciding to circle it in different directions. During this time, Hanlon saw a light come on in the house and notified Hoeppner by radio, who told him to knock on the front door, which he says he did. Hoeppner encountered Waller either just outside the garage door, or saw him inside the now-lit garage, carrying his weapon. After shining his flashlight at Waller, Hoeppner asked him to drop the gun.

After Waller eventually complied, Hoeppner said Waller picked up the weapon again and pointed it toward him, leading him to believe Waller intended to fire at him. As a result, he drew his own department-issued .40-caliber Glock 22 and fired six shots, all of which struck and injured Waller. Other officers and emergency medical technicians soon arrived on the scene and attempted to treat Waller, who was pronounced dead in the garage at 1:26 a.m.

== Investigation ==
Officers from the FWPD's major case unit arrived on the scene shortly afterwards. Kathy, distraught after coming out to the garage after hearing shouting and other sounds outside and finding her husband lying facedown in a pool of his own blood, was taken to a nearby hospital due to her extremely elevated blood pressure and interviewed a couple of hours later. The investigating officers also obtained a search warrant for the house and recovered evidence from it, such as the shell casings ejected by Hoeppner's gun.

Hoeppner was interviewed twice, in the hours after the shooting, along with doing a walk-through, and again a week later. Both times he recounted seeing Waller with a gun he refused to put down after repeatedly being asked to do so, and angrily asking Hoeppner to stop shining his flashlight in his face. Hoeppner perceived Waller as disrespectful of him as a police officer. "He had this attitude towards us of ... it was almost an attitude of, you can't tell me to drop my gun," he said. Waller did put the gun down on his wife's Volkswagen, but remained "standoffish" as Hoeppner approached, and then picked it up again. Believing Waller might be a burglar, and fearing for his life, he fired, citing his training.

Hanlon was also interviewed twice and did a walk-through several hours later, both separate from Hoeppner. He largely corroborated Hoeppner's account of confronting Waller in the garage, who kept asking him to "get that damned light out of my eyes" and eventually putting the gun on the car's roof only to pick it up again and apparently point it at Hoeppner. Hanlon added that he had identified himself as police and believed from Waller's reaction that he had heard it.

Hanlon's account differed from Hoeppner's in how far he said Hoeppner was from Waller when he fired. In his interview, Hoeppner initially said he was 7 yards (6.4 m) away; during his later walk-through, he said he was no closer than the 13 feet (4.0 m) measured between his position when he said Waller picked his gun up again, leading him to fire. On the other hand, Hanlon both in his interview and walk-through said Hoeppner was 2–3 feet (61–91 cm) away.

Kathy, at the hospital, told the detective interviewing her that she had not understood anything she heard from outside the house due to poor hearing in one ear. Upon seeing her husband face down in a pool of blood, she began screaming because he took Coumarin, a prescription anticoagulant, as a result of a heart condition, and she feared he might bleed to death as a result. Jerry's autopsy confirmed the presence of the drug in his system, and found his cause of death to be multiple gunshot wounds. Seven were counted, but counts of the remaining rounds in both officers' magazines, and the casings, were consistent with Hoeppner's account of firing six shots. The pathologist who performed the autopsy said it was entirely possible for one bullet to have passed through Waller's forearm before entering his chest, thus inflicting two wounds.

=== Conclusion ===
The FWPD's report on the shooting concluded that the disparity between where Hoeppner and Hanlon said the former was standing relative to Waller as he fired likely resulted from the two officers' focus on the gun. It also pointed to what other police officers have described as the "tunnel vision", or selective attention, particularly in their perception of time around an event such as a shooting, and cited several academic studies in support of that notion. (Note: In their lawsuit, the Wallers discounted these as they had been published in journals that were not peer-reviewed.) The report concluded that since Hanlon and Kathy Waller both heard Hoeppner shouting, he was giving loud verbal commands, that due to the light from the garage the officers' uniforms were clearly visible where they were standing, and that thus "there was a significant amount of time and opportunity for Waller to recognize [them] as police officers and comply with [their] command to drop the gun."

Hanlon and Hoeppner were put on further probation while the investigation was pending; they had returned to full duty by late July. In October, Hanlon was fired over an unrelated incident, where the department concluded he had falsified an affidavit resulting from a traffic stop in August, claiming he had found drugs on the man when in fact officers at the city jail made the discovery.

At the end of January 2014, a Tarrant County grand jury declined to indict Hanlon and Hoeppner, after considering the matter in a 25-hour session over four days. "This tragedy has been devastating for the Waller family, friends and neighbors", said Fort Worth Police Chief Jeffrey Halstead. "We respect the decision of the grand jury and now that this investigation is complete, we hope the healing process can continue." An attorney for the Wallers, whose children had publicly disputed the police account, said they would comment at the appropriate time, when their own investigation was done.

== Litigation ==
On May 26, 2015, almost two years after Jerry Waller's death, his widow and their two children filed a wrongful death suit against the city, Hanlon, Hoeppner, Halstead and several other officers it alleged conspired to manipulate the department's investigation so the officers involved would be unduly absolved of responsibility. Their complaint, filed in federal court for the Northern District of Texas, alleged that Hanlon and Hoeppner's actions that night reflected poor training and management on the city's part. Had they been properly trained, the situation would not have ended the way it did.

Specifically, the Wallers alleged:

- the department should not have permitted two rookie officers to respond to a call together on the night shift;
- Hanlon and Hoeppner could have been better trained in how to use the GPS units in their police cruisers to find the exact address they had been dispatched to rather than its general vicinity; (Note: The FWPD report had found that in standard mode, the GPS units in its police cars would only provide directions to the street and the 100-block of the dispatched address. Inputting the address to which Hanlon and Hoeppner were dispatched that night produced directions that ended where they had parked.)
- they could have used their flashlights to illuminate the front of the Wallers' house, which would have told them they were at the wrong house;
- by not using their flashlights as they approached the house they were going against common police procedure, which would have entailed one officer knocking on the front door and the other patrolling around the rear;
- they did not find the silence around the house significant despite having been dispatched to a report of an audible alarm;
- their actions in the Wallers' back yard, repeatedly shining their flashlights around and conversing as they did, alerted the couple's dogs and could have led the Wallers to believe they were burglars;
- they did not touch the hood of the parked car they found to see if it was hot, as it might have been had it recently arrived, nor did they look at its license plate number and use their lapel microphones to have it checked, in which case they would have learned it was Waller's and that they were probably at the wrong address, and
- it was doubtful that a 72-year-old man coming out of the house was a burglar as no man that old had ever been arrested on that charge in Fort Worth's history.

The Wallers also challenged two aspects of the police narrative. Hanlon, they said, could not have knocked on the front door as he claimed he had since that would have led the dogs, already awake and barking, to run to that side of the house from the rear. He had shortly after the shooting told the dispatcher over the radio that Waller would not put his gun down, but when interviewed by detectives four hours later said he had, briefly, consistent with Hoeppner's account. The Wallers alleged that the inconsistencies and improbabilities in Hanlon's account suggest that in fact he never witnessed the shooting. They noted that the department had to be aware that Hanlon had issues with being truthful not only because of what it fired him for a few months later, but because it had initially rejected his application for failing to disclose required information, only accepting Hanlon after several other police departments in the Metroplex, including Dallas, had rejected him as well, the Wallers alleged.

The family maintained that contrary to Hoeppner's account Waller had never left the garage, since it took ten seconds for the door to completely open and Kathy had made sure it was closed before going to bed. They noted that in the department's report Hoeppner admitted to never having verbally identified himself as a police officer. Lastly, they said that the pattern of wounds in the autopsy report, the position of Waller's gun and lack of blood or evidence that any bullet had hit it, indicated that he had been unarmed when Hoeppner fired.

Waller's body was also moved, the family alleged, many times in violation of Texas law that allows that only with the permission of the medical examiner. While police records indicate 36 different officers or other personnel were allowed into the crime scene, including attorneys retained by the police union to represent the two officers' interests, the FWPD produced statements from only six. They further accused the police of searching the Waller house prior to getting a warrant, and secretly recording their interview with Kathy Waller at the hospital, actions they alleged were part of a coverup to deny the Wallers their state and federal rights of access to the courts. The Wallers noted a pattern of recent violent incidents involving the FWPD, some of which also involved mistaken addresses and probationary officers on the night shift, suggesting that this resulted from the "Fort Worth Way", a culture encouraging aggressive policing within the department.

The lawsuit also challenged part of the holding of a 1978 U.S. Supreme Court decision, Monell v. Department of Social Services of the City of New York, which held that municipalities could not be held liable for civil and constitutional rights violations under respondeat superior solely for acts of their employees. "The largest corporate entities in the United States are cities and counties that should, as a matter of the due process and equal protection guaranteed citizens by the Fourteenth Amendment to the U.S. Constitution, hold governments responsible for the acts of its employees in the same way that the smallest of small businesses is held responsible" the complaint said. "[T]he constitutional rights afforded to citizens of Texas to be free from unreasonable searches and seizures are virtually non-existent under the Monell standard whereas in most other states, victims of such constitutional violations do have a remedy."

All the individual defendants pleaded qualified immunity and moved for summary judgement. The district court found that they were not entitled to qualified immunity and thus denied summary judgement. Kathy Waller died in 2017; her daughter continued the lawsuit as executrix of her mother's estate in addition to her individual capacity as a plaintiff, along with her brother.

=== 2019 ===
The defendants made an interlocutory appeal to the Fifth Circuit, which held for them on all but one issue in 2019. The plaintiffs' claims that the defendants' post-shooting actions had denied them access to the courts by possibly altering or destroying key evidence were deemed unripe since the proceedings they might have impacted had not yet occurred, and whether the defendants' actions had adversely affected the evidence was not yet known. "They are actively—and so far successfully—litigating their claim", wrote Judge Carolyn Dineen King for a three-judge panel, noting the extensive forensic evidence they had introduced. The courts also lacked jurisdiction under Texas law to grant declaratory relief since they alleged no ongoing or future injury.

King's observation related to the one issue on which the panel sided with the Wallers: Hoeppner's qualified immunity claim. The Wallers had, she observed, introduced enough evidence to plausibly argue that Waller was unarmed when Hoeppner fired, which would be a violation of Waller's clearly established constitutional rights. The officer's alternative theory, that Waller might have dropped the gun while he was being shot rather than before, contradicted his statement to investigators and did not make the plaintiffs' theory implausible. Nor was the autopsy report's inconclusiveness on this issue dispositive.

=== 2021–22 ===
The case resumed in district court with Judge Mark T. Pittman presiding over the trial of the Wallers' claims against the city. In 2020 both parties again moved for summary judgement. The following year Pittman, calling the case "undeniably tragic", held for the city on the Wallers' claims, as the training issues they complained of were "too attentuated" to have had an effect on the shooting, particularly given Fifth Circuit precedent that limited the time period courts could examine in excessive force cases to the moments, nor could a direct relationship be shown between the city's police policies and the shooting: "Although the officers' errors and the City's failure to have a policy aimed at reducing such errors are clear and worthy of blame, they did not contribute to Hoeppner's use of excessive force ... when Hoeppner met Waller in the garage, one-on-one, early in the morning, both armed with guns, there was no time for additional training." The Wallers had also failed to show a deliberate indifference by the city to the possible adverse consequences of the policies in question. As a result Pittman did not need to reach Monell.

The Wallers again appealed to the Fifth Circuit, which consolidated their appeals, along with their Fourth Amendment claim over the searches and Hoeppner's appeal of the denial of qualified immunity, into one case. In September 2022 a panel consisting of the circuit's chief judge, Priscilla Richman, Edith Brown Clement and Kurt D. Engelhardt handed down a per curiam opinion, which they ordered not be published, upholding Pittman's grant of summary judgement to the city and the earlier denial of qualified immunity to Hoeppner, and finding they had no jurisdiction to consider the Fourth Amendment claim because it had earlier been dismissed.

Both affirmances of the summary judgements turned on whether a dispute of fact existed in the record. Against the city, the Wallers had not shown sufficient facts to overcome the law, but against Hoeppner they had introduced enough material facts to raise the genuine question of whether Jerry Waller had been armed when Hoeppner fired. In both situations the court could not reverse.

The Wallers appealed the decision to the U.S. Supreme Court. In March 2023 it denied their petition for certiorari.

== See also ==
- Deaths in 2013
- List of killings by law enforcement officers in the United States, May 2013
- Killing of Nathan Heidelberg, Texas police officer fatally shot in 2019 by homeowner acquitted of murder charges
- Killing of Atatiana Jefferson, Fort Worth woman fatally shot in her own home in 2019 by police officer later convicted of manslaughter
- Killing of Breonna Taylor, Louisville woman fatally shot in her own home by police officers
