= End of Watch Call =

Custom practiced by US police after a police officer's death

The End of Watch Call or Last Radio Call is a ceremony in which, after a police officer's death (usually in the line of duty but sometimes from illness), the officers from his or her unit or department gather around a police radio, over which the police dispatcher issues one call to the officer, followed by a silence, then a second call, followed by silence.

An example:

Radio Lakewood 101…No answer Lakewood 101…Lakewood 101 out of service. Gone but not forgotten.

Sometimes the dispatcher will mention the officer's honors and may add other words in memoriam.

In some cases the call is made twice, once immediately after the officer's death, then one more formally closer to the date of or actually at the officer's funeral.

== History ==
The practice of the end of watch call began in the mid–2000s in police departments on the East Coast of the United States. By 2010 the practice had spread to the West Coast, and to firefighters, Emergency Medical Responders, aviation, air medical transportation, forest rangers, and game wardens in the United States and Canada.

== Media depictions ==
- An End of Watch call is played 28 minutes into Episode 6, Season 2 of Bosch.
- The custom as practiced in the New York City Police Department (NYPD) was depicted in the "End of Watch" Season 3 Episode 8 of the police procedural Elementary.
- On the soap opera General Hospital, the character Jordan Ashford uses a radio to make the Last Call to Nathan West, an officer killed in the line of duty by his father, Cesar Faison.
- An End of Watch call is played near the end of Episode 10, Season 1 of the police procedural Lincoln Rhyme: Hunt for the Bone Collector.
- The last call is made for Sheriff Liz Forbes on season 6 episode 15 of The Vampire Diaries.
- The practice of the Los Angeles Police Department (LAPD) was shown in the episode "Reckoning" of Southland.
- An End of Watch call occurs on Episode 16, Season 2 of the dramatic comedy The Mysteries of Laura, starring Debra Messing and Josh Lucas.
- The movie End of Watch, starring Jake Gyllenhaal and Michael Pena, follows two officers during their day to day duties in the south end of Los Angeles.
- An end of watch call is made for Deputy Luna in episode 3, titled "10-8 Deputy Down", of Season 1 of the procedural drama Deputy.
- An End of Watch call is played 40 minutes into Episode 10, Season 2 of the drama Chicago Med, stating Officer Kathryn Windham's honorifics.
- Casualty series 29 episode 6 "Last Call". During paramedic Jeff Collier's funeral paramedics hold their radios up for Jeff's last call, after he was in a car explosion.
