= Rise of the Warrior Cop =

2013 book by Radley Balko

Rise of the Warrior Cop: The Militarization of America's Police Forces
- Cover Art
- Author: Radley Balko
- Cover artist: Pete Garceau, Jenna Pope
- Language: English
- Subject: Sociology, current affairs, constitutional law, criminal justice
- Published: July 9, 2013
- Publisher: PublicAffairs
- Publication place: United States
- Media type: Print (hardcover and paperback)
- Pages: 400 pp.
- ISBN: 978-1610394574

Rise of the Warrior Cop: The Militarization of America's Police Forces is a 2013 book written by investigative journalist Radley Balko that focuses on the subject of militarization of police in the United States.

== Summary ==
The main argument of Rise of the Warrior Cop is that the introduction of the war on drugs in the 1960s has caused the police and legal institutions of The United States to progressively grow in power and influence, while continuing to have little to no accountability. Balko introduces his central thesis by first tracing the historical origins of contemporary police institutions beginning with law enforcement in the Roman Republic, Medieval England and Colonial America.

Balko introduces the interpretation of the Third Amendment to the United States Constitution implicitly prohibiting the use of a military or paramilitary group for day to day criminal law enforcement.

== Reception ==
Rise of the Warrior Cop received mostly positive reviews upon its release from across the political spectrum. Former Texas Representative and Republican presidential candidate Ron Paul praised the book: "Rise of the Warrior Cop is a comprehensive look at the reasons for, and the results of, the increasing militarization of law enforcement. Civil libertarians on the left and limited government conservatives on the right should pay especially close attention to Radley Balko's examination of the link between 'the war on drugs' and law enforcement's increased use of police state tactics." Journalist and former constitutional lawyer Glenn Greenwald also praised the book: "Vibrant and compelling. There is no vital trend in American society more overlooked than the militarization of our domestic police forces, and there is no journalist in America who is more knowledgeable and passionate about this topic than Radley Balko. If you care about the core political liberties of Americans, this is a must-read."

Jack Dunphy in a review published in National Review wrote a mostly positive review of the book stating, "For all my cop's quibbles with Rise of the Warrior Cop, I was struck by how much I found to agree with in the book. Balko makes a compelling case that in America today there are too many SWAT teams operating with too little accountability, further exposing the country to the dangers this magazine identified in 1996."

== Bibliography ==
- Balko, Radley (2013). Rise of the Warrior Cop: The Militirization of America's Police Forces. PublicAffairs.
- Rosman, David. "a book review by David Rosman: Rise of the Warrior Cop: The Militarization of America's Police Forces". www.nyjournalofbooks.com. New York Journal of Books.
- Gregory, Anthony. "Rise of the Warrior Cop: The Militarization of America's Police Forces, by Radley Balko". The Independent Institute.
- Goldstein, Diane (July 9, 2013). "Review: Radley Balko's Rise of the Warrior Cop". Huffington Post.
- Schneier, Bruce (August 5, 2013). "The Army in Our Midst". Wall Street Journal.
- Dunphy, Jack (August 18, 2013). "Watching the Watchmen". National Review.
- "Rise of the Warrior Cop by Radley Balko [Review]". kirkusreviews.com. Kirkus Reviews.
