= Ryan Frederick =

Former prisoner of the state of Virginia

Ryan David Frederick (born 1979 or 1980) is a former prisoner of the state of Virginia. He was convicted in 2009 of voluntary manslaughter for killing a police officer who was serving a search warrant. Frederick has said that he acted in self-defense and did not know that the person breaking into his house was a police officer. The case is notable for the magnitude of support the defendant received from his community, the press, and blogs, as well as for the relative leniency of the charge the jury chose for conviction in the death of an on-duty police officer. Frederick was released from prison in 2016.

== Shooting ==
On the night of January 17, 2008, Frederick awoke to his dogs barking at an individual breaking into the front door of his Chesapeake, Virginia house. Unbeknownst to Frederick, the intruder was actually a plainclothes police officer. The officer, after breaking through the lower part of the door, crawled halfway through the door to try to unlock the deadbolt. Upon seeing the intruder, Frederick fired his pistol once. The bullet struck Detective Jarrod Shivers in the shoulder and ruptured a major artery, killing him.

Three days before the police attempted the no-knock raid, Frederick's residence had been broken into by a police informant who had rifled through the defendant's belongings. The informant reported to police that he found several marijuana plants, growing lights, irrigation equipment and other gardening supplies and that Frederick was growing marijuana in his garage. Based on this information, law enforcement officials secured a warrant to enter Frederick's home. In the course of the trial, Frederick was shown to be an avid gardener who maintained a koi pond and Asian plants in his yard. One of his plants was a Japanese maple tree, which resembles marijuana when its leaves are green.

After the raid, the police found the gardening supplies and a small amount of marijuana. In Virginia at the time, simple possession of marijuana was an unclassified misdemeanor with a maximum penalty of 30 days in jail and a $500 fine for a first offense. A second offense carried a maximum penalty of 12 months in jail and was a Class 1 misdemeanor. (Virginia Law Ref: § 18.2-250.1.) The state legalized marijuana in 2021. Frederick had no prior criminal record and was placed by law in the first category.

On February 4, 2009, Frederick was sentenced to 10 years imprisonment on the charge of voluntary manslaughter for killing Shivers.

According to critics, the Frederick case mirrors another shooting which occurred in New Hanover County, N.C., where college student Peyton Strickland was shot when a police officer participating in a raid on the student's residence mistook the sound of a SWAT battering ram for a gunshot. The officer discharged his weapon several times into the home as Strickland came to answer the door, striking and killing both the student and his dog. The department paid $4.25 million to the parents in restitution, but no charges were filed against the officer.

== See also ==
- Cory Maye, Mississippi man convicted in death of officer he shot, believing him to be an intruder, during raid on his house.
- Killing of Nathan Heidelberg, Texas police officer fatally shot by homeowner, later acquitted, on front porch; shooter believed officer was a burglar
