= Radley Balko =

American writer (born 1975)

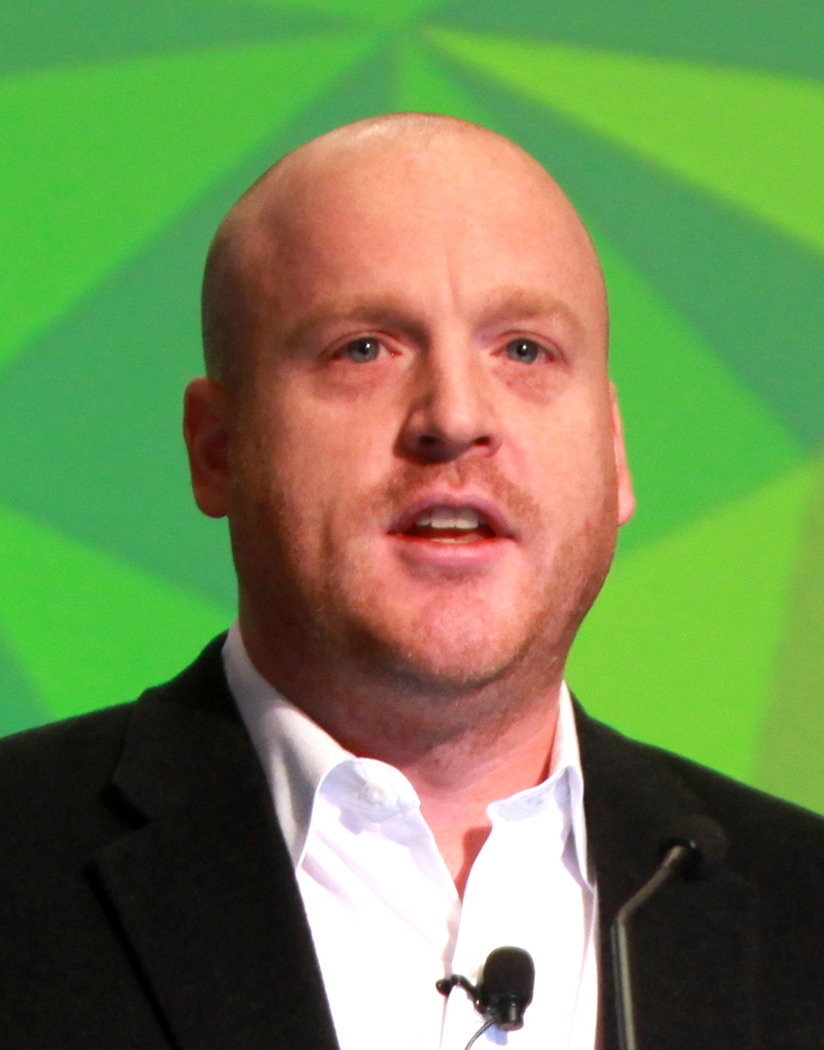
- Balko speaking at the 2014 International Students for Liberty Conference
- Born: Radley Prescott Balko; April 19, 1975 (age 51)
- Education: Indiana University Bloomington (BA)
- Occupation: Journalist
- Spouse: Liliana Segura

Radley Prescott Balko (born April 19, 1975) is an American journalist, author, blogger, and speaker who writes about criminal justice, the drug war, and civil liberties. In 2022, he began self-publishing his work after being let go from The Washington Post, where he had worked as an opinion columnist for nine years. Balko has written several books, including The Rise of the Warrior Cop and The Cadaver King and the Country Dentist.

== Early life ==
Balko earned a B.A. in journalism and political science in 1997 from Indiana University Bloomington.

== Career ==
Balko blogs about criminal justice, the drug war, and civil liberties. He has worked as an opinion writer for The Washington Post, a senior writer and investigative reporter for The Huffington Post, a senior editor at Reason magazine, and a policy analyst for the Cato Institute, specializing in vice and civil liberties issues. He writes on drug policy, police misconduct, obesity, alcohol, tobacco, and civil liberties. He also writes on trade and globalization issues and more generally on politics and culture. He was also a biweekly columnist for Fox News from 2002 until 2009. His work has been published in The Wall Street Journal, Forbes, Playboy, Time, The Washington Post, the Los Angeles Times, Slate, Reason, Worth magazine, Canada's National Post, and the Chicago Tribune. He has appeared on CNN, CNBC, Fox News, MSNBC, and National Public Radio. He began writing an opinion blog at The Washington Post in January 2014.

Balko's work on "no-knock" drug raids was profiled in The New York Times, and cited by U.S. Supreme Court Justice Stephen Breyer in his dissent in Hudson v. Michigan. He is credited with breaking and reporting the Cory Maye case; his work on the Maye case was cited by the Mississippi Supreme Court. He has also written extensively about the Ryan Frederick case and the raid on Cheye Calvo's home.

Balko has advocated the abolition of laws criminalizing drunk driving, arguing that the "punishable act should be violating road rules or causing an accident, not the factors that led to those offenses. Singling out alcohol impairment for extra punishment isn't about making the roads safer".

He has expressed his position against the judicial policy of civil asset forfeiture, arguing that it is a "practice contrary to a basic sense of justice and fairness".

== Books ==
Balko has authored two books on the topic of increasing militarization in police forces, and a third on institutional racism and junk forensic science in the criminal justice system.

- Rise of the Warrior Cop: The Militarization of America's Police Forces (PublicAffairs), 2013.
- Overkill: The Rise of Paramilitary Police Raids in America (Cato Institute), 2006.
- The Cadaver King and the Country Dentist New York : PublicAffairs, 2018. ISBN 9781610396912, OCLC 965806090

== Awards ==
In 2009, Balko's investigative report on expert witness fraud in a Louisiana death penalty case won the Western Publication Association's Maggie Award for reporting.

In 2011, The Week named Balko a finalist for Opinion Columnist of the Year. Also in 2011, the Los Angeles Press Club named Balko Best of Show Journalist of the Year, the judges saying:

Radley Balko is one of those throw-back journalists that understands the power of groundbreaking reporting and how to make a significant impact through his work. Time and time again, his stories cause readers to stop, think, and most significantly, take action.

== Personal life ==
Balko is an atheist.
