= Killing of Atatiana Jefferson =

2019 police manslaughter of a woman in Fort Worth, Texas

- Location of Fort Worth within Tarrant County and within Texas

- Fort Worth (Texas) Fort Worth (the United States)
- Location: Fort Worth, Texas, U.S.
- Date: October 12, 2019; 7 years ago c. 2:30 a.m. (CDT)
- Attack type: Homicide by shooting, police brutality, manslaughter
- Weapon: Handgun
- Victims: Atatiana Koquice Jefferson, aged 28
- Perpetrator: Aaron Dean
- Charges: Murder: Manslaughter (lesser included offense)
- Verdict: Guilty on the lesser included offense of manslaughter
- Convictions: Manslaughter
- Sentence: 11 years, 10 months, and 12 days in prison (Note: Eligible for parole after 5 years, 11 months, and 6 days)

Atatiana Koquice Jefferson was a 28-year-old African-American woman who was fatally shot inside her home by a police officer in Fort Worth, Texas, in the early morning of October 12, 2019. Police arrived at her home after a neighbor called a non-emergency number, stating that Jefferson's front door was open.

Police body camera footage showed officers walking outside the home with flashlights for a few minutes then one officer yells, "Put your hands up! Show me your hands!", while discharging his weapon through a window.On October 14, 2019, Officer Aaron Dean, the shooter, resigned from the Fort Worth Police Department and was arrested on a murder charge. On December 20, 2019, Dean was indicted for murder. Jefferson was black and the officer who shot her is white, prompting news outlets to compare Jefferson's shooting to the September 2018 murder of Botham Jean in nearby Dallas.

On December 15, 2022, Dean was found guilty on the lesser offense of manslaughter. He was sentenced to 11 years, 10 months, and 12 days of imprisonment, an apparent reference by the jury to the month and day of the incident.

== People involved ==
=== Atatiana Jefferson ===
Atatiana Koquice Jefferson (November 28, 1990 – October 12, 2019) was a 28-year-old African American woman and pre-medical graduate student of Xavier University of Louisiana from where she graduated in 2014. Relatives said she worked in human resources. She lived in the house to care for her mother and nephew and began living with them in May 2019.

=== Aaron Dean ===
On October 14, 2019, Interim Police Chief Ed Kraus identified Officer Aaron Dean as the shooter. Dean was commissioned as an officer with the Fort Worth Police Department in April 2018 after completing the Fort Worth Police Academy a month prior in March 2018. At the time of the shooting, Dean had been with the department for approximately 18 months. Prior to the shooting, the only substantial entry in his Fort Worth police personnel file was about a traffic collision.

In 2004, Dean received a citation from the Arlington Police Department in his hometown of Arlington, Texas for assault by contact, a class C misdemeanor, while at the University of Texas at Arlington for touching a woman's breast in the campus library. The incident was discussed during his videotaped job interview with the Fort Worth Police. He pled no contest and paid a fine. According to the Fort Worth Police Department, a Class C misdemeanor would not prevent employment with their department as a police officer.

Dean's training records from his first year on the job note concerns from supervisors. These concerns included that he had "tunnel vision" and "needs improvement on communicating with the public and fellow officers." Dean's most recent performance evaluation was made in the spring of 2019, where he received high marks from a supervisor.

== Killing ==
=== Welfare call ===
It has been reported that just prior to 2:30 a.m on the morning of October 12, 2019, police received a "welfare call" from the neighborhood of Hillside Morningside, noting that the front door to someone's home was open. According to Jefferson's family, prior to police arriving at her home, she was playing video games in her home with her nephew.

=== Open structure ===
During the trial it was established that, rather than responding to a "welfare call" as previously reported, the officers were dispatched to an "Open Structure" call, which usually relates to a potential burglary. The police policy for these two calls is very different.

=== Body camera footage ===
Body camera footage released by the Fort Worth Police Department shows that two officers had walked quietly around the side of the home. Dean had walked into Jefferson's backyard. Seeing Jefferson in the window of her home, the officer yelled "put your hands up! Show me your hands!" and then fired a single shot through Jefferson's window.

Describing the video, the BBC wrote that Dean fired "within seconds" of seeing Jefferson. The BBC wrote that the footage does not appear to show police identifying themselves or whether she was armed. The footage also does not reveal if Dean could see the gun that Jefferson held, as the view through the window was obstructed by the reflection from his flashlight. The officer partnered with Dean told authorities that she could only see Jefferson's face through the window.

=== Nephew's account ===
Jefferson's eight-year-old nephew told the authorities that while playing video games they heard noises outside the window. The nephew testified that Jefferson took her gun from her purse and walked to the window holding it at her side while looking out the window, before she was shot. The nephew's account was used as the basis for the arrest warrant. Interim Chief Kraus stated that it, "makes sense that she would have a gun if she felt that she was being threatened or there was someone in the backyard." According to the Jefferson family attorney Lee Merritt, the firearm was lawfully owned and Jefferson had a concealed carry license. The nephew testified that the front door was open because they were making hamburgers and they had burned, so the doors were open to let the smoke out.

=== Death ===
Jefferson was killed by the shot and pronounced dead at the scene at 3:05 am. Police officers stated that they attempted to provide emergency medical care to Jefferson but were unsuccessful.

== Investigation, arrest and indictment ==
Police officials stated that the officer fired after perceiving a threat. Fort Worth Police Chief Ed Kraus stated that Dean resigned before he could be fired for what Kraus said included violating departmental policies on use of force, de-escalation, and unprofessional conduct. Had Dean not voluntarily resigned and been fired instead, his separation paperwork would have been sent to the Texas Commission on Law Enforcement and would have reflected that he had been dishonorably discharged from the department.

Manny Ramirez, the president of the Fort Worth Police Officers Association, said Dean had never been the subject of a police investigation. Kraus said Dean refused to cooperate with investigators and had not allowed Kraus to question him. Dean had not given an oral or written statement to investigators. Ramirez said he and other officers with knowledge of the situation were dumbfounded as to why Dean would have fired his weapon in this situation. Ramirez also said there was no way to explain Dean's actions.

Based on footage from Dean's body camera which captured the shooting, a warrant was issued for his arrest. He was arrested at his attorney's office on October 14, 2019, and charged with murder. He was given a $200,000 bond, which he posted, and was released about three hours later. Kraus said that Dean had not provided a written statement or answered questions.

On October 25, 2019, Tarrant County District Attorney Sharen Wilson said evidence would also be presented to a grand jury for a formal indictment. Dean is the only officer to face a murder charge in Tarrant County for a shooting committed while on duty. He was indicted by a grand jury on a murder charge on December 20, 2019.

== Trial ==
In October 2020, Tarrant County judge David Hagerman set a tentative date of August 2021 for Dean's trial. After being initially delayed due to a backlog in the courts stemming from the COVID-19 pandemic, the trial was rescheduled in November 2021 to begin on January 10, 2022.

In December 2021, the trial was delayed again, to May 2022, due to two defense witnesses being unavailable in January. At that time, Dean's defense attorneys filed a motion for a change of venue, claiming that local media coverage had made it impossible for their client to receive a fair and impartial trial in Tarrant County.

On May 4, 2022, Judge Hagerman denied the defense's change of venue motion but granted another postponement, this one due to health issues being experienced by Dean's lead attorney. The new trial date was set for June 23.

On May 16, Dean's attorneys filed a motion asking Judge Hagerman for yet another delay, as they claimed to have higher priority cases in May and June and "cannot be ready" by June 23 because of the preparation time required to meet their caseload.

During a hearing on June 3, Dean's attorneys claimed their own personal vacation plans should be considered for a further delay of the trial, but Hagerman denied their request and confirmed that the trial would begin on June 23. On June 9, Dean's attorneys filed a motion asking for Judge Hagerman to be replaced, claiming that he had "grown increasingly hostile, overbearing and rude" to them. On June 13, Tarrant County judge George Gallagher agreed to yet another delay in the trial pending the result of a hearing on the defense's recusal motion. On June 28, judge Lee Gabriel approved the defense's recusal motion, removing Hagerman from presiding over the trial. After Hagerman's recusal, the trial was assigned to Judge Gallagher and delayed again.

On August 18, 2022, a new trial date of December 5 was set, with jury selection slated to begin on November 28.

In November, Dean's attorneys filed another change of venue motion, claiming that their client could not get a fair trial in Tarrant County because former Fort Worth mayor Betsy Price and former police chief Ed Kraus had made public comments about the killing of Jefferson in the days after the shooting. The second change of venue motion was denied and the trial began on December 5, 2022.

On December 15, 2022, Dean was found not guilty of murder but guilty of the lesser included offense of manslaughter. On December 20, he was sentenced to 11 years, 10 months, and 12 days of imprisonment.

Dean is currently imprisoned in the Ramsey Unit in Rosharon, Texas.

== Federal civil rights lawsuit ==
The Jefferson family has been represented by John Coyle of the law firm McEldrew Purtell and Lee Merritt of the Merritt Law Firm, with the assistance of the MacArthur Justice Center. On May 19, 2021, a federal civil rights lawsuit was filed in the Northern District of Texas against Dean and the City of Fort Worth. Dean moved to dismiss the case arguing he was entitled to qualified immunity, but this motion was denied by the court.

Dean appealed that decision to the Fifth Circuit Court of Appeals, which held oral argument on the case on December 3, 2024. The Fifth Circuit panel consisted of Judge James C. Ho, Judge Kurt D. Engelhardt, and Judge Dana Douglas. On February 25, 2025, the panel issued an opinion ruling 3-0 that Dean was not entitled to qualified immunity on the use of excessive force, but ruled 2-1 that Dean was entitled to qualified immunity on the 4th Amendment question of Dean entering the curtilage of the home.

On June 12, 2026, the City announced a proposed settlement of the civil rights case for $11.25 Million. It is believed to be the largest excessive force settlement in Texas history.

== Reactions ==
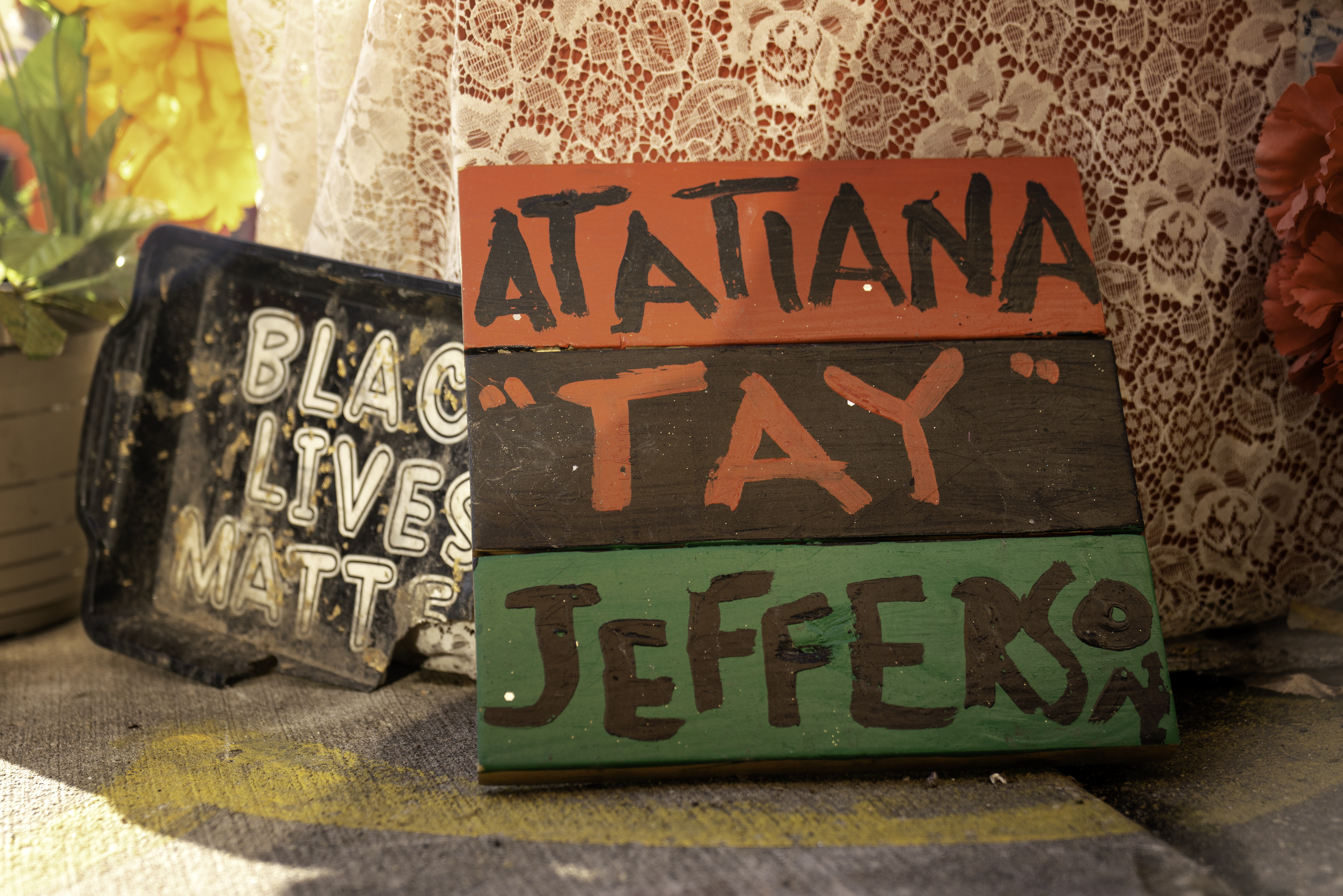
A sign bearing Jefferson's name at the George Floyd memorial in Minneapolis, 2021

Fort Worth Mayor Betsy Price called the event "tragic" and promised a "complete and thorough investigation" by police chief Ed Kraus. CBS News reported that the investigation would then be forwarded to the Law Enforcement Incident Team for the Tarrant County District Attorney.

The National Association for the Advancement of Colored People called Jefferson's death unacceptable. The neighbor who called for the welfare check told reporters that he never intended for an aggressive law enforcement response. He stated: "No domestic violence, no arguing. Nothing that they should have been concerned with, as far as them coming with guns drawn to my neighbor's house. There wasn't any reason for a gun shot that I know of."

Jefferson's funeral was paid for by two professional athletes, former Dallas Mavericks player Harrison Barnes and Philadelphia Eagles player Malik Jackson. A GoFundMe was also created by the family lawyer on behalf of the family.

The case has been cited as a cause of loss of trust in law enforcement. During a press conference in the days following the shooting, Kraus became emotional as he compared the erosion of public trust to ants working to build an anthill, when "somebody comes with a hose and washes it away and they just have to start from scratch."

== See also ==
- Killing of Jerry Waller, 2013 incident in which Fort Worth police shot and killed an elderly white man on his property
