= List of unarmed African Americans killed by law enforcement officers in the United States =

This is a list of African Americans reportedly killed while unarmed by non-military law enforcement officers in the United States. Events are listed whether they took place in the line of duty or not, and regardless of reason or method. The listing documents the occurrence of a death, making no implications regarding wrongdoing or justification on the part of the person killed or officer involved. Killings are arranged by date of the incident that caused death.

== 2000–2009 ==
Total for 2000-2009: 130

Date	Name	Age	City	Description
February 12, 2000	Eugene Pitchford	43	Peoria, Illinois	Police attempted to arrest Pitchford, a homeless man. During his arrest police hit him in the head and pepper sprayed him, and Pitchford died of asphyxiation.
March 1, 2000	Malcolm Ferguson	23	New York City, New York	Plainclothes officer Louis Rivera shot and killed Ferguson during a struggle. Prosecutors declined to charge Rivera. A civil jury ruled the NYPD responsible for Ferguson's death, awarding $10.5 million in a wrongful death suit.
March 16, 2000	Patrick Dorismond	26	New York City, New York	Patrick Dorismond was a security guard who was shot by two undercover police officers who had approached Dorismond asking him where they could purchase marijuana. In an ensuing scuffle, Dorismond was fatally shot. A grand jury declined to indict Officer Vasquez in the death of Dorismond, announcing that they had found the shooting to be accidental. On March 12, 2003, the City of New York agreed to pay the Dorismond family a settlement of $2.25 million.
May 7, 2000	Keith Daughtry	19	Fort Pierce, Florida	Daughtry was shot and killed by a DEA agent when he allegedly tried to take the agent's gun. But some witnesses said they heard Daughtry call out "don't shoot me, don't shoot me," before he was shot.
June 12, 2000	Ronald Beasley	Unknown	Berkeley, Missouri	Police attempted to arrest Murray during a drug investigation. Officers shot him in his vehicle, along with his uninvolved friend Ronald Beasley, sitting in the passenger seat. Three officers, including the shooters, testified that the car was moving when police shot them, while four officers said it was not. A grand jury declined to indict the officers involved.
June 12, 2000	Earl Murray	Unknown	Berkeley, Missouri	Police attempted to arrest Murray during a drug investigation. Officers shot him in his vehicle, along with his uninvolved friend Ronald Beasley, sitting in the passenger seat. Three officers, including the shooters, testified that the car was moving when police shot them, while four officers said it was not. A grand jury declined to indict the officers involved.
July 18, 2000	Robert Brown	45	Philadelphia, Pennsylvania	Brown, a homeless man with a history of mental illness, was shot and killed by Amtrak Police while swinging a metal chair.
July 19, 2000	George Bibins	35	Omaha, Nebraska	Police chased Bibins after he was suspected of stealing a car. After the vehicle crashed, Officer Jared Kruse jumped out of his vehicle and shot Bibins as he was still in the car. Kruse was charged with manslaughter but the charges were dropped.
August 29, 2000	Errol Shaw	39	Detroit, Michigan	An officer shot and killed Shaw, who was deaf and mute, as he raised a rake over his head. The officer was charged with manslaughter and later acquitted.
September 1, 2000	Prince Jones	25	Fairfax County, Virginia	Undercover Officer Carlton Jones (no relation) followed Prince and displayed his gun, saying he was police, although he did not display his badge. Carlton said he shot Prince after he drove his car towards Carlton but witnesses disputed this.
October 28, 2000	Anthony Lee	39	Los Angeles, California	During a costume party an officer shot actor Anthony Lee after mistaking his rubber gun for a real weapon.
November 7, 2000	Roger Owensby Jr.	29	Cincinnati, Ohio	Police tackled Owensby after he fled a chase, holding him to the ground and placing him in a police vehicle, where he died. An autopsy stated that Owensby died either from a chokehold or from the officers on top of him. Officers Robert 'Blaine' Jorg and Officer Patrick Caton were indicted on manslaughter and misdemeanor assault, but Caton was found not guilty while Jorg's trial ended in a mistrial, which the prosecutor chose not to retry.
November 23, 2000	Melvin Guy	23	Tallulah, Louisiana	Guy was shot in the back while fleeing on foot by an off-duty auxiliary officer. The officer was attempting to arrest Guy for escaping from jail.
December 7, 2000	Richard Holtz	45	East Windsor, New Jersey	After he exited a hotel room nude holding a TV remote, police shot at Holtz 27 times, with some rounds striking Holtz. Holtz was wanted for stabbing to death his ex-wife, 30-year-old Michelle Schroeder Carta.
January 4, 2001	Vernard Davis	21	Rochester, New York	Davis was allegedly accidentally killed by a shotgun blast by an officer during a drug raid.
January 9, 2001	Clifford Lewis	18	Louisville, Kentucky	Following a chase, Lewis backed a van into an officer. Police fired, then fired again after Lewis reached into his waistband. No weapons were found in the vehicle.
February 2, 2001	Annette Green	37	St. Louis, Missouri	Green was fatally shot four times as she stepped down downstairs during a drug raid. Seven years later on October 31, 2008, her former boyfriend, Todd Shepard, fatally shot a police officer in University City in retaliation for Green's death.
February 9, 2001	Donald "D.J." Venerable	33	Sacramento, California	Two officers shot Venerable, who was holding a cell phone.
February 26, 2001	Adrena Kitt	21	Pensacola, Florida	Police were investigating Kitt for drug dealing. As officers attempted to arrest her, Kitt drove forward at less than ten miles per hour, hitting a police officer. Another officer then shot through the driver's side window, killing Kitt.
April 7, 2001	Timothy Thomas	19	Cincinnati, Ohio	Police attempted to arrest Thomas for 14 nonviolent misdemeanors, causing a pursuit. Officer Stephen Roach shot Thomas as he rounded a corner in an alley. Roach stated that he believed Thomas was reaching for a weapon, but an investigation determined he was actually pulling up his pants. Roach was tried for negligent homicide but was found not guilty.
April 30, 2001	Bilal Dashawn Colbert	29	Irvington, New Jersey	Officer William Mildon shot Colbert as he backed his vehicle to flee the officer. Colbert was driving his fiancée's daughters to school at the time of the incident. Mildon, who had been cleared in a previous shooting from 1997, was cleared of wrongdoing later that year.
July 26, 2001	Charmene Pickering	27	New York City, New York	Pickering was shot during a drug raid in which she was not a suspect. She was removed from life support and died several days after the shooting occurred. Her death was ruled an accidental discharge, although such an accident would have required the officer to have his finger on his firearm's trigger.
July 27, 2001	Andrea Nicole Reedy	32	Hampton, Virginia	After being boxed in by officers, police shot Reedy when she threatened them with her car.
January 21, 2002	Eddie Lee Macklin	20	Miami, Florida	An undercover officer jumped onto the hood of the car Macklin was in and fired through the windshield, killing him. The vehicle Macklin was driving was stolen.
January 31, 2002	Kenneth Strother	20	New Orleans, Louisiana	NOPD Rookie officer Robert Macklin shot Strother in an alley after Strother allegedly tried to take the officer's firearm.
February 12, 2002	Willie Murray Jr.	37	Boston, Massachusetts	Murray Jr. died after he was shot by Boston Police officer Shawn West, who was black.
April 3, 2002	Trey Antuan Lively	30	Miami Gardens, Florida	Officer Ford, who is black, spotted Lively's station wagon leaving a drug house. Ford first tried to stop the vehicle, then followed it through the neighborhood before crashing into a pole. A passenger, Phillip Brown, exited the car, but the Lively, the driver, did not. Lively allegedly reversed and Ford shot at him through the passenger window.
May 1, 2002	Egbert David Dewgard	31	New York City, New York	Agents from the Drug Enforcement Administration (DEA) attempted to arrest Dewgard in Brooklyn. Following a chase, in which Dewgard rammed his car into an agent's and nearly hit a toddler on a sidewalk, he engaged in a physical altercation with Agent Jude Tanella, who shot him in the back. Tanella was charged with manslaughter but a federal judge dismissed the charge.
May 9, 2002	Genie McMeans Jr	23	Tallahassee, Florida	McMeans, who was a passenger in a vehicle, allegedly exited the vehicle and started yelling at Florida Highway Patrol Trooper Kreshawn Walker-Vergenz, who pulled over a vehicle. Walker-Vergenz ordered McMeans to lie on the ground, which McMeans complied, but he later stood up and walked back to the car. Walker-Vergenz thought McMeans was going for a weapon, and when he didn't follow a command to stop, she shot McMeans in the back. McMeans then reentered the vehicle. He then allegedly left the vehicle and charged Walker-Vergenz. Walker-Vergenz then shot McMeans three times in the chest.
July 14, 2002	Corey Ward	18	Atlanta, Georgia	Ward was shot while driving away from police. The officer who shot him was charged with murder but granted immunity by a judge.
August 15, 2002	Eric Daniel Foster Jr.	25	Fresno, California	Shot in the chest by Fresno police officer Russell Cornelison. Cornelison thought Foster was reaching into his waistband for a firearm.
November 15, 2002	Bernard Rogers	26	Pittsburgh, Pennsylvania	Rogers was shot by the Pittsburgh Housing Authority Police during a struggle. Accounts on what occurred differ on what happened
December 21, 2002	Charles Dixon Sr.	43	Mount Oliver, Pennsylvania	During a birthday party, Dixon's brother left a buffet line and dipped his hand into a bowl of spaghetti. Officers hired as security for the event attempted to arrest him, which Dixon objected to. Around a dozen officers piled onto Dixon facedown, causing him to die two days later from suffocation. His death was ruled a homicide.
December 24, 2002	Michael Ellerbe	12	Uniontown, Pennsylvania	Two Pennsylvania state troopers shot Ellerbe in the back during a foot pursuit. A civil jury later ruled that Ellerbe had been shot intentionally, awarding his family $28 million in a wrongful death case.
January 24, 2003	Roy Jean Williams	22	Roland, Oklahoma	Williams was driving on I-40 with his girlfriend, and her two children, when Officer Jeremy Day pulled Williams over for speeding. Day asked Williams to sit in the front seat of his patrol car while he wrote a ticket. The two men had a confrontation out when Williams allegedly tried to leave the patrol car. Williams was then shot and killed when he allegedly reached for Day's gun.
February 28, 2003	Orlando Barlow	28	Spring Valley, Nevada	A woman called police to report that Barlow, who was babysitting her children, was holding them hostage with a shotgun. An officer shot Barlow after he allegedly put his hand near his waist as he was surrendering.
March 2, 2003	Justin Fields	21	Milwaukee, Wisconsin	Fields was blocking a firetruck in Downtown Milwaukee. Fields fled this scene and a pursuit ensured by officer Nawotka, who had two civilians detained in the back of his vehicle already. Fields collided with a vehicle at MLK and North Avenue (a mile away from where the chase began), and when as he was fleeing the scene, he was shot dead by Officer Craig Nawotka fired three shots into his vehicle, hitting fields in his back.
March 8, 2003	Michael Pleasance	23	Chicago, Illinois	Pleasance arrived at 95th and Dan Ryan station where Officer Alvin Weems was arresting Pleasance's friend after a fight. Suddenly, Weems turned and shot Pleasance in the face. Weems was not fired or arrested, but was later promoted. Weems was found dead in his home from self-inflicted gunshot wound on May 5, 2011.
March 15, 2003	Marquis Hudspeth	25	Shreveport, Louisiana	Police pulled Hudspeth over for a traffic violation. An officer shot him after mistaking his cell phone for a gun.
April 26, 2003	Charquissa Johnson	23	Washington, D.C.	The circumstances surrounding Johnson's death is disputed. Police say Johnson was shot when she allegedly didn't drop a weapon. Others say Johnson wasn't armed and had her hands up before she was shot.
May 5, 2003	Kendra James	21	Portland, Oregon	An officer shot and killed James during a traffic stop as she attempted to drive away, with the officer claiming most of his body was in the vehicle when she put the car into drive. The officer was suspended but an arbitrator lifted the suspension.
May 16, 2003	Alberta Spruill	57	New York City, New York	Police mistakenly raided Spruill's apartment and threw a concussion grenade, causing her to have a heart attack. Spruill's death was ruled a homicide.
May 22, 2003	Ousmane Zongo	43	New York City, New York	Plainclothes officer Brian Conroy shot and killed Zongo as he ran away during a raid on a warehouse. Conroy was convicted of criminally negligent homicide but did not serve any jail time.
May 29, 2003	John Eric Henderson	32	Chattanooga, Tennessee	Officer Christopher Gaynor shot Henderson during a traffic stop after he reached into his car and picked up a brown object. Henderson was holding a bottle of cologne. Gaynor was charged with criminally negligent homicide but was acquitted.
August 18, 2003	Cornelius Ware	20	Chicago, Illinois	Ware was shot six times by a Chicago police officer while in/or near his car. Witnesses say Ware had his hands up when he was shot. It was later revealed that officers planted a gun at the scene.
August 24, 2003	Deondre Brunston	24	Compton, California	Deputies were called to Brunston's aunt's home after an altercation. Police surrounded Brunston on a nearby porch, where he said we would shoot a police dog but also stated he did not have a gun. When deputies unleashed a K-9 on Brunston he threw a sandal at the dog, and deputies shot and killed him and the dog. The canine was airlifted to a hospital, while Brunston was left on the porch steps.
October 16, 2003	Ronnie Diamond	32	Amite City, Louisiana	Diamond was shot and killed during a foot pursuit.
October 31, 2003	Mannix Franklin Sr.	31	Milwaukee, Wisconsin	Police responded to a call that a man would not leave his wife's house and encountered Franklin outside. Franklin hid behind a car before getting up with a hand inside his jacket. An officer shot him five times, believing Franklin had a gun. An inquest jury declined to recommend charges be filed against the officer.
November 3, 2003	James Gerth	39	Rockford, Illinois	Gerth was spotted in Downtown Rockford by Rockford Police driving a stolen vehicle. Gerth reportedly ignored the police officers commands to get out the and reportedly threaten to hit the officers with the vehicle. Police Officer Todd Murr then shot and killed Gerth. The shooting was later ruled justified.
November 30, 2003	Nathaniel Jones	41	Cincinnati, Ohio	Police beat Jones with nightsticks after he was reported by paramedics at a White Castle restaurant. Jones fell unconscious and died. His death was ruled a homicide by a coroner.
December 28, 2003	Allen Simpson	23	Dallas, Texas	Simpson died after he was put in a chokehold.
January 2, 2004	Leslie Prater	37	Chattanooga, Tennessee	Police responded to reports of a naked man standing near his car. After he refused to answer questions, four officers pinned Prater to the ground and pepper sprayed him, before hog-tying him. His death was declared a homicide due to positional asphyxia.
January 24, 2004	Timothy Stansbury	19	New York City, New York	Officer Richard S. Neri accidentally shot Stansbury as he opened a rooftop door. A grand jury declined to indict Neri.
February 20, 2004	William Lomax	26	Las Vegas, Nevada	An officer responding to an unrelated call encountered several security guards who had called an ambulance for Lomax after determining he was on drugs. Lomax fought the guards and the officer, the latter of whom hit Lomax with a stun gun while trying to restrain him. Lomax was hospitalized and died the next day. His death was ruled a homicide.
March 28, 2004	James Jahar Perez	28	Portland, Oregon	Officer Jason Sery shot Perez as Sery's partner struggled to pull Perez out of the car. Police said the motorist refused to produce a driver's license or get out of the car once he was pulled over for failing to signal a turn in North Portland.
May 26, 2004	Christopher Hicks	39	Chicago, Illinois	Police attempted to arrest Hicks for passing between moving CTA rail cars. Police beat and choked Hicks, who became unresponsive and died. His death was ruled a homicide. During the incident, multiple people made calls to 911 to report two white men beating a black man.
August 20, 2004	D'Koy Dancy	14	Baltimore, Maryland	An off-duty officer with the Maryland Department of Health and Mental Hygiene, Ronald Johnson, shot Dancy as he broke into a shed in Dancy's backyard. Johnson claimed he accidentally fired from his son's second-floor bedroom after he tripped, hitting Dancy in the back. Johnson pleaded guilty to involuntary manslaughter and was spared prison time.
November 11, 2004	Dennis Crawford	31	Detroit, Michigan	Crawford was unarmed and was killed by LaRon York and Barron Townsend. According to reports "York shot him four times, once in the back, once in the head, and twice in the leg." The mother of Crawford's son claims that Crawford was shot 15 times in an online report. In addition, the federal lawsuit was settled with the Crawford family for an undisclosed amount and York was later removed from the police force, however Townsend remained and was involved in the killing of Tommie Staples in 2008.
February 6, 2005	Devin Brown	13	Los Angeles, California	Brown died after being shot by LAPD police officer Steven Garcia after he shot into the vehicle Brown was in after he allegedly drove towards Garcia and other officers after a chase. No charges were filed against Garcia.
May 7, 2005	Jashon Bryant	18	Hartford, Connecticut	Officer Robert Lawlor shot at a car driving towards an FBI agent, wounding the driver and killing Bryant, a passenger. Lawlor stated that he shot Bryant because he believed he was armed, but no weapon was found. Lawlor was charged with manslaughter and assault but was acquitted.
July 30, 2005	Raymond Robair	48	New Orleans, Louisiana	Police beat Robair and put him into the back of a cruiser. He was taken to a hospital, where he died. His death was ruled an accident by a coroner, however an independent autopsy determined the death was a homicide. In 2011, two police officers involved in Robair's arrest were convicted of civil rights violations by a federal court. Former NOPD officer Melvin Williams received a sentence of over 21 years in federal prison for beating Robair to death. His partner, Officer Matthew Dean Moore, received a sentence of seventy months for obstructing justice by giving false statements to the FBI in relation to the case. Williams was released from prison early in September 2025 due to the First Step Act.
September 2, 2005	Henry Glover	31	New Orleans, Louisiana	Officer David Warren shot and killed Glover as he went to retrieve loot following Hurricane Katrina. Glover's body was later burned. Warren was convicted of Glover's death but his conviction was overturned.
September 4, 2005	James Brisette	17	New Orleans, Louisiana	Police opened fire on multiple people on Danziger Bridge, killing Brisette and Madison and wounding four other people. Four officers were convicted for their roles in the shooting.
September 4, 2005	Ronald Madison	40	New Orleans, Louisiana	Police opened fire on multiple people on Danziger Bridge, killing Brisette and Madison and wounding four other people. Four officers were convicted for their roles in the shooting.
October 23, 2005	Erson Alexander Welchen	22	Bakersfield, California	Welchen died after he was fatally shot by three Bakersfield Police officers. Welchen allegedly attempted to run away during a traffic stop.
January 6, 2006	Martin Anderson	14	Panama City, Florida	Anderson died after being forced to run track for two hours at a boot camp-style youth detention center, until he collapsed.
January 15, 2006	Vincent Smith	16	Gary, Indiana	Patrolman Levi Randolph responded to a report of a robbery and shot Smith after he reached into his sweatshirt pocket. An autopsy stated Smith was shot in the side of the neck. Randolph was charged with reckless homicide but was found not guilty.
April 26, 2006	Benjamin Uwumarogie	22	Glen Ellyn, Illinois	Uwumarogie was shot in the head by Officer Jason Bradley. Bradley had responded to a domestic violence call and found Uwumarogie allegedly trying to drown his year-old son in a bathtub.
June 4, 2006	James Sims	52	Phoenix, Arizona	Died after being tasered. Police were serving an eviction notice.
June 20, 2006	Jesse Levelt Everett Jones	26	Banning, California	Officers Michael Bennett and Brian Walker shot and killed Jesse Levelt-Everett Jones when he turned "in a threatening manner" while fleeing on foot.
August 3, 2006	Deon Studiemyer	19	Decatur, Georgia	Studiemyer was shot by an off-duty officer who said Studiemyer was burglarizing his home.
August 7, 2006	Ellis Woodland	13	Chicago, Illinois	Chicago Police officers approached Woodland and his friend while they were walking on the street and accused them of involvement in a robbery. Officers claimed that Woodland pointed a gun at them and fled and they opened fire, hitting Woodland four times. Police claimed Woodland had a BB gun but his family denied this.
September 12, 2006	Lorenzo Matthews	21	Stone Mountain, Georgia	Officer Torrey Thompson and another officer fired at Matthews, suspected of a shooting, with Thompson firing as Matthews ran away holding a black object later determined to be a phone. Thompson was charged with murder but the charge was dropped.
September 17, 2006	Marcus Roach-Burris	42	Neenah, Wisconsin	Roach-Burris died after he was tasered. The coroner blamed his death on cocaine intoxication.
September 30, 2006	Dominic Felder	27	Minneapolis, Minnesota	Police responded to a domestic disturbance. Officers Jason King and Lawrence Loonsfoot shot Felder after he reached into his waistband, though he was unarmed. A federal jury ruled that the officers used excessive force and awarded Felder's family $1.8 million.
October 6, 2006	Herman Barnes	31	Harris County, Texas	A deputy looking for a mailbox vandal found Barnes, who had been diagnosed with schizophrenia. Police tased him multiple times, causing his death.
October 25, 2006	Youwus Vilpre	24	Lithonia, Georgia	Federal agents of the Southeast Regional Fugitive Task Force adempted to arrest Vilpre at an apartment complex. Vilpre was wanted for drug-related offenses. After negotiations failed, agents allegedly witness Vilpre point an unknown object at them. The agents then shot Vilpre. It was later revealed that the object was a shoe.
November 14, 2006	Darren Faulkner	41	Byhalia, Mississippi	Faulkner died after he was tased, pepper sprayed by sheriff's deputies.
November 25, 2006	Sean Bell	23	New York City, New York	Multiple officers shot Bell in his car the morning before his wedding. Two of Bell's friends were also wounded.
November 26, 2006	Brandon Moore	16	Detroit, Michigan	An off-duty officer working as a security guard kicked Moore and his friends out of the store because they were not accompanied by an adult. As Moore and his friends left the security guard shot Moore in the back.
January 10, 2007	Phillip Miller	43	Los Angeles, California	Police responded to reports of a disturbance during a party at a Masonic lodge and heard gunshots. A man who had been shot several times exited from the front, followed by Miller, who was holding his waistband. A police sergeant then shot Miller, later telling investigators he believed Miller was reaching for a weapon.
January 23, 2007	David Antjuan Ware	29	Ypsilanti, Michigan	Undercover Officer Uriah Hamilton shot Ware during a buy-bust operation after he turned around and put his hand in his waistband after a chase. Ware did not have any weapon, just the money given to him by the undercover officer. Hamilton was cleared of any criminal wrongdoing by the county prosecutor.
February 18, 2007	Robert Harper	38	Newport News, Virginia	Police officers came to arrest Harper on a bond revocation at his apartment building. Police officers were called and after 30 minutes of negotiation Harper, who was unarmed, was shot.
February 18, 2007	Haki Thurston	22	Santa Rosa, California	Thurston, who was wanted for the murder of his cousin, was shot 13 times after he allegedly put his right hand in his waistband.
March 22, 2007	Brandon Washington	20	Dallas, Texas	Officer Martin Rivera shot Washington, suspected of stealing a candy bar, when he allegedly did not remove his hands from his pockets. Washington was unarmed and had a cellphone in his pocket. Rivera was once a police partner with Officer Amber Guyger, who was convicted of the murder of Botham Jean in 2018.
April 14, 2007	Jerriel Da'Shawn Allen	19	San Bernardino, California	San Bernardino police Officers Adam Affrunti and Chris Gray shot Allen because they allegedly didn't see his hands after he exited an SUV that crashed into a fence following a car chase.
May 20, 2007	Anthony Smashum	41	Savannah, Georgia	Following a chase Smashum was climbing a fence when Officer Antonio Taharka shot him twice. Taharka pled guilty to involuntary manslaughter in 2009.
July 22, 2007	DeAunta Farrow	12	West Memphis, Arkansas	Officer Erik Sammis shot and killed Farrow in a parking lot after mistaking a toy gun for a real weapon. In 2009 Governor Mike Beebe signed into law a bill that banned toy guns that resembled real ones. The bill was initially named after Farrow but the bill's sponsor changed the name after complaints from Farrow's family.
September 22, 2007	Shawn Watson	17	Dallas, Texas	Watson and three others attempted to rob an undercover officer. The officer shot Watson after he reached for his waistband. About a year later Watson's brother was killed by police after he allegedly reached for a handgun.
November 12, 2007	Michael Knight	21	Miami, Florida	Officers from a robbery unit followed Blackwood's vehicle for illegal window tints. Believing the police vehicle could have been stolen, Blackwood attempted to drive to his girlfriend's house. He made a wrong turn, pulling into a cul-de-sac. Two officers approached the vehicle and opened fire, killing Knight and Blackwood and wounding Blackwood's girlfriend. Police said they shot after the car lurched backwards, though Blackwood's girlfriend claimed the car only moved after Blackwood was shot.
November 12, 2007	Frisco Blackwood	21	Miami, Florida	Officers from a robbery unit followed Blackwood's vehicle for illegal window tints. Believing the police vehicle could have been stolen, Blackwood attempted to drive to his girlfriend's house. He made a wrong turn, pulling into a cul-de-sac. Two officers approached the vehicle and opened fire, killing Knight and Blackwood and wounding Blackwood's girlfriend. Police said they shot after the car lurched backwards, though Blackwood's girlfriend claimed the car only moved after Blackwood was shot.
November 12, 2007	Khiel Coppin	18	New York City, New York	After he was sent to an interfaith crisis center, Coppin left and returned to his mother's apartment. After police arrived Coppin jumped out of a first-story window and claimed to have a gun. Coppin then pulled out an object and police shot him. Coppin was holding a hair brush.
January 4, 2008	Tarika Wilson	26	Lima, Ohio	Police raided Wilson's home searching for her boyfriend, wanted for drug trafficking. Sergeant Joseph Chavalia shot and killed Wilson and wounded her one-year-old son, who she was holding. Chavalia was acquitted of negligent homicide and negligent assault.
January 4, 2008	Glen Boldware	47	Los Angeles, California	Boldware, who allegedly stole something from a lumber yard, was being followed by LAPD officer Officer Peter Mah in his unmarked car. Boldware became aware of this and stopped his vehicle. Boldware walked up to Mah's car allegedly carrying a lighter that looked like a small-caliber pistol. Mah then shot Boldware multiple times.
January 11, 2008	Xavier Jones	29	Coral Gables, Florida	Jones was being disruptive at a party. Jones died after being tasered by police.
January 17, 2008	Baron Pikes	21	Winnfield, Louisiana	While arresting Pikes for a drug possession warrant, Officer Scott Nugent tased Pikes multiple times while he was handcuffed, including twice as he was unconscious, despite Nugent's police report stating Pikes was not resisting. An autopsy ruled his death a homicide. Nugent was later charged with manslaughter but was acquitted by a jury.
January 30, 2008	Edward Lamont Hunt	27	Baltimore, Maryland	Officer Tommy Sanders shot Hunt as he ran from him at a shopping center after he reached for his waistband. Sanders was indicted but found not guilty of voluntary and involuntary manslaughter.
January 31, 2008	Frederick Devon McAllister	35	Bridgeport, Connecticut	McAllister was mistaken for his cousin, wanted on criminal charges in South Carolina, and a chase ensued. After a foot chase, an officer shot and killed McAllister, who had no weapon at the time.
February 21, 2008	Kenneth Marion	17	Jacksonville, Florida	Police pursued Marion and three other teenagers after a robbery at a gas station. An officer encountered Marion who allegedly moved his hands as if in a shooting position, and the officer shot and killed him. The other three teens were charged with murder.
March 1, 2008	Maurice Leroy Cox	38	Los Angeles, California	After being pulled over Cox allegedly told officers he would kill them and reached for his glovebox. After a barricade situation, Cox fled on foot and pointed an object at police who shot him. Cox was holding a cigarette lighter power adapter.
March 28, 2008	Henry Bryant	35	Indianapolis, Indiana	Bryant died after he was tasered for one minute by police at a O'Charley's Restaurant. Bryant went into cardiac arrest.
April 10, 2008	Tyrone Hawkins	31	Dundee, Florida	Hawkins was shot dead after an altercation during a theft investigation.
April 24, 2008	Dewayne Chatt	39	West Memphis, Arkansas	Chatt died after being tasered three times by police at a restaurant.
May 6, 2008	Aaren Gwinn	21	North Chicago, Illinois	Shot after he attempting to drive away from North Chicago police officers.
May 11, 2008	Michael Byoune	19	Inglewood, California	Police heard gunfire and witnessed a man running into a vehicle. When the vehicle neared them, officers opened fire, killing Byoune, sitting in the passenger seat, and wounding the driver and a backseat passenger. None of the men were the shooter involved.
May 15, 2008	Derrick Jordan	22	Dayton, Ohio	Police followed a vehicle during a drug investigation. When the vehicle drove forward and hit officers, one shot through the window, hitting Jordan, who was sitting in the passenger's seat.
June 23, 2008	Artavious DeBose	22	Jacksonville, Florida	Debose had just robbed a GameStop. After crashing his car after a high-speed, he fled on foot into residential neighborhoods. Debose was shot and killed after allegedly reaching for a gun, but Debose was unarmed.
July 1, 2008	Ruben Ortega	23	Inglewood, California	A gang task force pursued Ortega during a loitering call. An officer shot him after he refused to remove his hand from his waistband. Ortega was later found to have been unarmed.
July 25, 2008	Mack Woodfox	27	Oakland, California	Oakland Officer Hector Jimenez shot Woodfox in the back as he fled a traffic stop. No criminal charges were filled in Woodfox's death. Jimenez had shot and killed a man, Andrew Moppin-Buckskin, seven months prior to Woodfox's shooting under similar circumstances.
August 4, 2008	Andre DeMon Thomas	37	Swissvale, Pennsylvania	Thomas died after he was tasered three times by police. He died at the hospital three hours later.
October 28, 2008	Julian Alexander	20	Anaheim, California	Alexander was sleeping at the home he shared with his pregnant wife and in-laws when he heard a commotion outside. He grabbed a broomstick and walked outside, where he was shot and killed by an officer pursuing four burglary suspects.
October 28, 2008	Lawrence Allen	19	Philadelphia, Pennsylvania	Off-duty officers Chauncey Ellison and Robin Fortune searched for a thief who had stolen a pizza from their sons, finding him in front of Allen's home. After Allen, who was not involved in the robbery, attempted to defuse the situation, Ellison shot him. Allen died in 2009. Ellison and Fortune were fired, convicted of reckless endangerment, and sentenced to nearly two years in prison.
November 11, 2008	Dontaze Storey Jr.	29	Los Angeles, California	Police responded to reports of a man with a gun in Koreatown, Los Angeles. When officers arrived, Storey fled. Two officers shot him. Storey was holding a silver cell phone. Storey's son was awarded $750,000 for his father's death.
January 1, 2009	Oscar Grant	22	Oakland, California	Oscar Grant III was a 22-year-old African-American man who was killed in the early morning hours of New Year's Day 2009 by BART Police Officer Johannes Mehserle in Oakland, California. Responding to reports of a fight on a crowded Bay Area Rapid Transit train returning from San Francisco, BART Police officers detained Grant and several other passengers. BART officer Anthony Pirone kneed Grant in the head and forced Grant to lie face down on the platform. Mehserle drew his pistol and shot Grant; he was rushed to Highland Hospital in Oakland and pronounced dead later that day. On January 30, 2010, Alameda County prosecutors charged Mehserle with second-degree murder in their indictment for the shooting. Mehserle resigned from his position and pleaded not guilty. The trial began on June 10, 2010. On July 8, 2010, Mehserle was found guilty of involuntary manslaughter and not guilty of the murder charge and voluntary manslaughter.
January 18, 2009	Domonick Washington	26	Milwaukee, Wisconsin	Officer Dwight Copeland shot Washington in the chest after a traffic stop, stating he believed Washington was reaching for a gun. A witness to the shooting stated an officer pointed a gun at her and told her to stay put.
February 27, 2009	Joseph Forrest	61	Baltimore, Maryland	Police responded to a domestic call involving Joseph Forrest's nephew, also named Joseph Forrest. The younger Forrest and Officer Traci McKissick fought and during the struggle the elder Forrest was shot around a dozen times.
February 22, 2009	Roy Glenn Jr.	29	Humboldt, Tennessee	Officer Paul Carrier shot Glenn in the back after a traffic stop while Glenn was on his hands and knees. Carrier was found guilty of reckless homicide.
March 29, 2009	Shatona Evette Robinson	20	Charlotte, North Carolina	Shatona Evette Robinson was killed when Officer Martray Proctor crashed into her vehicle at high speed while responding to assist another officer on a routine traffic stop. He did not activate his sirens. Proctor was sentenced to three-years of probation.
March 29, 2009	Stephanie Montague	40	Frayser, Tennessee	Montague was killed when officer Mark Weatherly crashed into her vehicle. Her 17-year-old passenger was injured. In 2011 Weatherly was acquitted.
April 10, 2009	Robert Mitchell	16	Detroit, Michigan	Mitchell was tasered to death by Warren police after he fled a traffic stop.
April 18, 2009	Michael Patrick Jacobs Jr.	24	Fort Worth, Texas	Police responded to a report by Jacobs' family. Police tasered him twice, and he later had trouble breathing and died. The medical examiner ruled his death a homicide.
May 22, 2009	Broderick Dixon	27	Birmingham, Alabama	Dixon was shot and killed by off-duty officer Chevis Finley following a dispute. According to Finley he chased Dixon and shot him after Dixon entered an apartment where Finley and a woman were present. Finley was indicted on murder but convicted of manslaughter and was sentenced to 15 years in prison.
June 4, 2009	Yvette Williams	15	Rock Hill, South Carolina	Williams allegedly robbed a store. When officers arrived on scene, they assumed Williams had a 9mm gun since that's what the 911 caller told police. Of the 11 shots fired by the two police officers, 3 shots hit Williams. The gun turned out to be a BB gun.
July 5, 2009	Avery Cody Jr.	16	Compton, California	After being stopped for jaywalking, Cody was fatally shot by Deputy Sergio Reyes in the back. A revolver was recovered at the scene, but it's possible that it was planted. Surveillance video of the shooting did not show Cody with a gun, and DNA did not yield a match.
July 10, 2009	Woodrow Player III	22	Los Angeles, California	Deputies shot Player after he ran from police holding a cell phone. Police recovered a gun from Player's vehicle, but witnesses stated he was unarmed when he was shot.
July 11, 2009	Shem Walker	49	New York City, New York	Walker attempted to eject a man loitering on his mother's apartment stoop, unaware the man was actually an undercover narcotics detective observing a buy-and-bust operation. The unidentified officer shot Walker after a fight.
July 15, 2009	Parnell Smith	36	Oakland, California	During a foot pursuit, Smith ran into a car auto-body garage. Smith allegedly turned toward the OPD officers, Phong Tran and Scott Hewitt and allegedly reached for his waistband, causing Tran and Hewitt to shoot Smith. However, it was later proven Smith dropped his pistol in the street before he was killed. Smith was being pursued because he matched the description of a rapist. It later turned out that Smith was not the rapist.
July 24, 2009	Harold Phillips	54	Colfax, Louisiana	After having recently been released from prison, Phillips was playing with his sister in front of his home when Officer Stephan Merchant mistook it for an assault. Phillips ran, and following a fight Merchant shot Phillips five times in the back. Merchant pleaded guilty to manslaughter.
August 1, 2009	Michael Wayne McKnight Jr.	28	San Antonio, Texas	After responding to a disturbance call, police arrested McKnight for a warrant. He was taken to jail, where he complained of shortness of breath, and he later died at a hospital. The medical examiner's office ruled McKnight died from "intervascular sickling associated with sickle cell asphyxiation" and "excited delirium with physical struggle and restraint," and his death was ruled a homicide.
August 24, 2009	Mark Barmore Jr.	23	Rockford, Illinois	Police shot Barmore eight times during a struggle at a church daycare during a domestic abuse investigation. A grand jury declined to indict the officers but the city of Rockford settled a lawsuit for $1.1 million.
September 14, 2009	Darrick Collins	36	West Athens, California	A Los Angeles County Sheriff's Department deputy chased Collins up his driveway and into his own backyard, believing he was a robbery suspect. After allegedly witnessing Collins reach for his waistband, the deputy shot Collins through a wooden gate. The bullet fatally struck Collins in the back of the neck, killing him.
October 9, 2009	Kiwane Carrington	15	Champaign, Illinois	Officer Daniel Norbits accidentally shot Carrington while investigating a burglary.
November 14, 2009	Leonard Bailey Jr.	16	Richmond, California	Bailey and several other teenagers ran from a stolen vehicle. An officer shot Bailey when he turned around with his hands in his waistband. Bailey was unarmed, although there was a handgun in the stolen vehicle.

== 2010–2013 ==
Total for 2010-2013: 94

Date	Name	Age	City	Description
January 29, 2010	Aaron Campbell	25	Portland, Oregon	After firing six beanbag rounds at Campbell, Officer Ryan Lewton shot him in the back. Police were responding to a welfare call.
February 4, 2010	Darrell Swain	38	Wilmington, Delaware	A police officer investigating a murder witnessed a robbery in progress where a robber held Swain and another man at gunpoint. The officer fired at the robber, wounding him and killing Swain. The robber was charged with murder in connection with Swain's death.
February 4, 2010	Dennis Gregory	41	Baltimore, Maryland	Gregory died after getting shot by Baltimore Police officers Chris Funk and Matthew Ryckman, who allegedly were aiming for Gregory's friend, Glenn Brooks. Gregory was shot four times in the back. Gregory was an informant.
March 12, 2010	Reginald Wallace	40	Nashville, Tennessee	Police responded to reports of a burglary and encountered Wallace. When Wallace reached towards his pocket and grabbed a metal object, Officer Joe Shelton shot him. Wallace was holding an iPod.
March 16, 2010	Warren Collins	35	Indianapolis, Indiana	After a traffic stop turned foot pursuit, Collins was shot after fighting with a rookie cop.
March 20, 2010	Steven Washington	27	Los Angeles, California	Washington, who was autistic, died after being shot in the head by an LAPD officer in Koreatown. Washington was shot after he allegedly reached in his waistband. No weapons were recovered from Washington.
April 2, 2010	Willie Miller	25	Chicago, Illinois	Chicago Police officers were in the East Garfield Park neighborhood when they saw a large crowd. As they approached and the crowd began scattering, officers allegedly saw Miller walking away with a gun. Miller then fled and was then shot by an officer when he allegedly pointed a gun at them while running through an alley. Miller's family members say he was unarmed.
April 25, 2010	Lejoy Grissom	27	Culver City, California	Following a robbery police pulled Grissom over in a parking lot. Officer Luis Martinez fired three rounds from a submachine gun, killing Grissom. Martinez claimed Grissom had suddenly turned around with a shiny object in his hand, but other officers stated Grissom was facing officers unarmed.
May 3, 2010	Keith Briscoe	36	Winslow Township, New Jersey	Officer Sean Richards restrained Briscoe outside a Wawa. Briscoe fell unconscious and died, with his death being ruled a homicide due to positional asphyxia. Richards pled guilty to simple assault in connection with Briscoe's death.
May 14, 2010	Melvin Williams	33	East Dublin, Georgia	After a traffic stop, East Dublin police officer Jeffrey Deal shot Williams during a fight.
May 16, 2010	Aiyana Jones	7	Detroit, Michigan	Aiyana Jones was a seven-year-old girl from Detroit's East Side who was shot in the head and killed by a police officer during a raid conducted by the Detroit Police Department's Special Response Team on May 16, 2010. Officer Joseph Weekley was charged in connection with Jones' death, but his case was thrown out in 2015 after two mistrials.
June 1, 2010	Tyrone Brown	32	Baltimore, Maryland	Brown and some friends were at a Mount Vernon club when he swatted a woman's bottom with his hand. The woman told her friend, off-duty Baltimore Officer Gahiji Tshamba, who confronted Brown with a gun. Tshamba followed Brown into a nearby alley before firing on him, hitting him twelve times. Tshamba was sentenced to 15 years in prison for killing Brown, but only served ten.
June 16, 2010	Trevon Cole	21	Las Vegas, Nevada	A narcotics team investigated Cole for marijuana, although police had mistaken Cole for another man with the same name, who had a lengthy criminal record. After Cole sold marijuana to undercover officers, a narcotics team raided his home, with Detective Bryan Yant shooting him as he flushed marijuana down a toilet. Yant claimed Cole had lunged at him, but this was contradicted by physical evidence.
June 16, 2010	Dexter Luckett	23	Bellflower, California	Police responded to reports of shots fired and spoke to informants, one of whom directed officers to Luckett. An officer shot Luckett after he quickly moved his left hand towards his waistband. No weapon was found at the scene.
July 5, 2010	DeCarlos Moore	36	Miami, Florida	Officer Joseph Marin and another officer pulled Moore over after his car was wrongly identified as stolen. When Moore stepped out of his vehicle and grabbed a pair of sunglasses, Marin shot him.
July 5, 2010	Damon Lamont Falls	31	Oklahoma City, Oklahoma	Police responded to reports of a disturbance at a Dollar General and encountered Falls wearing a wig, fake mustache and beard, a ball cap, and sunglasses. After dropping a stun gun and running from police, officers tased him. He collapsed as police were walking him to a police car and was pronounced dead at a hospital. His death was ruled a homicide.
July 22, 2010	James Rivera Jr.	16	Stockton, California	Following a chase Officer Gregory Dunn and Deputy John Nesbitt shot Rivera after he crashed a minivan into a house. The officers stated they feared the van was going to back into them, but a judge stated that the officers saw the van was unable to move.
August 15, 2010	Tony Bean	43	Milwaukee, Wisconsin	Police held Bean down on the ground and handcuffed him after responding to a report of a man acting erratically. Bean fell unconscious and died in a police vehicle.
September 17, 2010	David Smith	28	Minneapolis, Minnesota	Police responded to a YMCA when staff reported Smith, who had bipolar disorder, was acting odd. Police handcuffed and knelt on Smith for about four minutes, causing his death. An autopsy said Smith's death was mechanical asphyxia caused by prone restraint.
September 30, 2010	Jamail Amron	23	Harris County, Texas	Amron called police, worried he was having a bad reaction to cocaine. Deputies from the Harris County Constable's Office, Precinct 4 restrained him, one of whom put his foot on Amron's head. Amron fell unconscious and died.
October 12, 2010	Eugene Walker	25	Town of Madison, Wisconsin	Earlier in the day, Walker reportedly threatened his ex-girlfriend with a gun at her residence in Fitchburg. Later in the day, 40-year-old Dane County sheriff's deputy Keith Severson encountered Walker at an intersection and a fight ensured. During the fight, Severson shot Walker seven times. Walker was later taken to UW Health University Hospital, where he was pronounced deceased. No gun was found on Walker's person. Severson was cleared of wrongdoing in relation to Walker's death.
November 8, 2010	Derrick Jones	37	Oakland, California	Officers Eriberto Perez-Angeles and Omar Daza-Quiroz shot and killed Jones during a chase after mistaking a scale for a gun.
December 4, 2010	Ontario Billups	30	Chicago, Illinois	Billups died after he was shot by a female officer on Chicago's southside. Chicago Police officers were conducting surveillance on an area where they believed a drug deal was going on. At some point the officers noticed a "suspicious" vehicle. When the officers approached the vehicle they allegedly found Billups inside the vehicle with his hands inside a jacket. Billups allegedly refused to remove his hands from the jacket. When Billups exited the vehicle, he allegedly made "aggressive movements" and the officer fatally shot him.
December 9, 2010	Eugene Ellison	67	Little Rock, Arkansas	Officer Donna Lesher and Detective Tabitha McCrillis, working off-duty security, entered Ellison's apartment after noticing his door was open. After telling them to leave, Ellison and the officers fought, and Lesher shot him. Lesher's husband was a police sergeant who oversaw the officers investigating the shooting, while Ellison was the father of two Little Rock Police officers, one of whom was with the department at the time.
December 11, 2010	Guy Jarreau Jr	34	Vallejo, California	Jarreau making an anti-violence music video when Vallejo Police arrived at the scene after receiving reports of a man brandishing a gun. Officer Kent Tribble shot Jarreau after he ran into an alley with a gun in his hand. But Jarreau's mother say Jarreau's hands were up when he was shot.
January 6, 2011	Darius Pinex	27	Chicago, Illinois	Pinex was shot dead by officers Raoul Mosqueda and Gildardo Sierra, when he attempted to drive away.
January 14, 2011	Reginald Doucet	25	Los Angeles, California	Officers responding to reports of Doucet yelling and behaving erratically shot Doucet after he scuffled with two officers. His family filed a lawsuit against the Los Angeles Police Department but it was dismissed.
March 8, 2011	Kemp Yarborough	37	New York City, New York	Police questioned Yarborough in connection with a fight at a playground in the Bronx. When Yarborough, who had asthma, reached for his inhaler, police pepper sprayed him. Yarborough died of an asthma attack, and an autopsy determined his death was a homicide.
April 25, 2011	Corey Brown	31	Trenton, New Jersey	Police responding to a domestic dispute shot and killed Brown after he raised his hand "as if he had a gun".
May 2, 2011	Walter Bailey	54	Eutawville, South Carolina	Richard Combs, Eutawville's police chief and only officer, shot and killed Bailey after he came to Eutawville's town hall to dispute his daughter's traffic ticket. Combs pled guilty to misconduct in office in exchange for having murder charges dropped.
May 8, 2011	Henry Lee Jones Jr.	28	North Little Rock, Arkansas	Officer Vincent Thornton shot Jones at a housing complex after he held a metal object. Jones was holding a cell phone.
June 7, 2011	Flint Farmer	29	Chicago, Illinois	Officer Gildardo Sierra shot and killed Farmer as he lay on the ground. Sierra stated he had drunk several beers before his shift and mistook Farmer's cellphone for a gun.
July 6, 2011	Derek Williams	22	Milwaukee, Wisconsin	Police arrested Williams for robbing a couple. After finding him behind an overturned table, an officer restrained and handcuffed him as he said he could not breathe. As they brought him to a squad car, he continued to tell them he could not breathe. He later died. The medical examiner's office initially ruled his death was natural and from sickle cell crisis, but they later revised it to homicide after the Milwaukee Journal Sentinel alerted them to newer records, including a video of his death and the opinion of forensic pathologist Werner Spitz.
July 18, 2011	Alonzo Ashley	29	Denver, Colorado	Police were called to the Denver Zoo after Ashley began to exhibit strange behavior, likely due to heat stroke. Officers placed Ashley on the ground and tased him, and by the time paramedics arrived Ashley had stopped breathing. An autopsy ruled his death a homicide and said it was caused by cardiorespiratory arrest brought by heat, dehydration, and exertion. The eight officers involved were cleared of wrongdoing. In 2021 the Denver Zoo apologized for their role in Ashley's death.
August 7, 2011	Everette Howard	18	Cincinnati, Ohio	Police at the University of Cincinnati responded to a dorm where Howard, a student in a summer class, was outside. An officer tased Howard, who died.
September 17, 2011	Jason Moore	31	Ferguson, Missouri	Police confronted Moore as he ran down a street yelling "God is good" and "I am Jesus" at passing vehicles. After an officer tased him multiple times, Moore died of cardiac arrest. A lawsuit was filed against the city of Ferguson shortly after the later death of Michael Brown, which the city settled for $3 million.
October 31, 2011	Cletis Williams	57	Jonesboro, Arkansas	An officer attempted to arrest Williams for a warrant. When the officer approached, he and Williams struggled over a taser. The officer pulled away from Williams and shot him several times.
November 17, 2011	Dwight Person	54	East Point, Georgia	During a drug raid an officer shot Person after he "made a threatening gesture" towards the officer.
December 12, 2011	Stanley Gibson	43	Las Vegas, Nevada	Following a mistaken burglarly report, officers responded and found Gibson, a Gulf War veteran with post-traumatic stress disorder, circling the parking lot at his apartment. Sergeant Michael Hnatuick devised a plan to remove Gibson from his vehicle with Officers Malik Grego-Smith, Jesus Arevalo, and John Tromboni, where Grego-Smith would shoot out Gibson's rear window with a beanbag, Hnatuick would spray pepper spray, and Arevalo and Tromboni would provide cover. Lieutenant David Dockendorf then arrived and took control of the plan. After Gibson revved his engine, which he had done several times before Dockendorf arrived, Dockendorf told Grego-Smith to shoot over a police radio. Grego-Smith fired a beanbag, which was followed by Arevalo firing several shots with an AR-15 rifle, killing Gibson. Arevalo was later fired, Dockendorf was demoted to officer, and Hnatuick was suspended for 40 hours.
December 13, 2011	Ariston Waiters	19	Union City, Georgia	Officer Luther Lewis responded to reports of fighting and shots fired and encounter Waiters, who fled. After Lewis ordered Waiters to the ground and began to handcuff him, Lewis shot Waiters in the back, claiming Waiters had attempted to take his gun, although a lieutenant later said Lewis had initially claimed he shot Waiters when he refused to show his hands. There were no witnesses to the shooting. A grand jury declined to charge Lewis.
December 29, 2011	Willie Ray Banks	52	Granite Shoals, Texas	Police responded to a report of Banks behaving strangely. Officers attempted to arrest him for public intoxication despite Banks being on his own property. Banks was tased and knelt on, losing consciousness before reviving and collapsing again. An autopsy determined Banks's death was a homicide.
January 14, 2012	Craig Ruise Jr	17	Jacksonville, Florida	Ruise was observed by Jacksonville Sheriff's Officers William Irvin and Mark Campanaro robbing a convenience store at gunpoint. When he stepped outside, one of the officers allegedly told him to drop the gun and the stolen money. When Ruise allegedly refused, Campanaro and Irvin shot him. It was later discovered that his "gun" was a toy gun which had been spray-painted black.
February 2, 2012	Ramarley Graham	18	New York City, New York	Officer Richard Haste followed Graham into his apartment and shot him as he attempted to flush marijuana down the toilet. Haste was charged with manslaughter but the charge was dropped.
February 6, 2012	Lamont Harmon	47	Sacramento, California	Deputies questioned Harmon while investigating a car theft. When Harmon turned to walk away, deputies used a taser, then shot him when he made a "furtive move" after the taser failed to work.
February 7, 2012	Manuel Loggins Jr.	31	San Clemente, California	Loggins, a Camp Pendleton Marine sergeant, crashed his SUV through a gate at San Clemente High School. Deputy Darren Sandberg shot Loggins after he exited his vehicle and allegedly refused commands. Loggins's two daughters, aged nine and fourteen, witnessed the shooting.
February 12, 2012	Troy Stewart	48	Corpus Christi, Texas	Officers responded to a report at a home about a man having trouble breathing. Police handcuffed and restrained Stewart after he struggled with officers, and he stopped breathing and later died. His death was ruled a homicide.
March 7, 2012	Wendell Allen	20	New Orleans, Louisiana	Officer Joshua Colclough shot and killed Allen as he walked down a flight of stairs unarmed and shirtless. Colclough pleaded guilty to manslaughter and was sentenced to four years in prison.
March 10, 2012	Marquez Smart	23	Wichita, Kansas	Police responded to a shooting and encountered Smart. An officer followed Smart and shot him five times as he lied face down in a parking lot. While a gun was found nearby and bullet casings and a magazine were found in the path he ran, Smart was unarmed when he was shot. An attorney for Smart's family stated that no evidence connected Smart to the gun and noted that many other people had run down the same alley where the gun was found.
March 14, 2012	Dane Scott Jr.	18	Del City, Oklahoma	Following a chase, Del City Police Captain Randy Trent Harrison had a scuffle, during which Harrison disarmed Scott of a gun. Scott ran away, and Harrison shot him in the back. Harrison was convicted of manslaughter in 2013.
March 15, 2012	Shereese Francis	30	New York City, New York	Francis's sister called EMTs to request Francis be taken to a hospital. Four officers restrained Francis facedown on a mattress. Within twenty minutes, Francis stopped breathing and was later pronounced dead. Her death was ruled a homicide by a medical examiner.
March 21, 2012	Rekia Boyd	22	Chicago, Illinois	Rekia Boyd was shot by Dante Servin, an off-duty Chicago police detective, on March 21, 2012. Servin was charged with involuntary manslaughter but found not guilty in 2015.
March 24, 2012	Kendrec McDade	19	Pasadena, California	Officers Jeffrey Newlen and Matthew Griffin responded to reports of an armed robbery, but the 911 caller later stated that the men who robbed him did not have weapons. The officers shot McDade, whom they said matched the description of the robber, after he ran towards a police vehicle.
May 9, 2012	Davinian Williams	36	Jacksonville, Florida	Officer Jeff Edwards shot Williams during a traffic stop. Edwards said he thought Williams was reaching for a gun, but no weapon was found. Williams was fired, settled a lawsuit with Williams' family in court, and later testified on their behalf in a lawsuit regarding the Jacksonville Sheriff's Office's alleged failures to monitor problematic officers.
May 26, 2012	Rudy Eugene	31	Miami, Florida	Eugene was biting and assaulting a homeless man prior to being shot. Eugene was unarmed when he was shot at least 5 times by Miami Police officer Jose Rivera.
May 28, 2012	Anton Barrett Sr.	41	Vallejo, California	Police pursued Barrett for driving without lights on. After the vehicle crashed Barrett and his son fled, and police caught up to Barrett outside an apartment building. Police shot him when he pulled out a dark-colored metal object later determined to be a wallet.
June 14, 2012	Shantel Davis	23	New York City, New York	Following a pursuit an officer shot Davis, who was in a stolen car.
July 14, 2012	James Brown Jr.	26	El Paso, Texas	Brown, an active-duty soldier at Fort Bliss, was serving a two-day sentence at a jail in El Paso when officers informed him he would have to stay longer due to a fine that had not been calculated. When Brown became belligerent, officers and jailers restrained him. He was taken to the infirmary where he was given a spit mask. After he was returned to his cell, jailers found Brown unresponsive, and he died the following day. An autopsy originally determined his death was natural, but a second examination by a forensic pathologist determined his death was a homicide.
July 24, 2012	James Harper	31	Dallas, Texas	An officer shot and killed Harper after a chase, during which Harper and the officer engaged in at least two physical fights. The officer shot Harper in the stomach and hand. The officer was cleared by a grand jury in December 2013.
August 11, 2012	Cjavar Galmon	18	Tangipahoa, Louisiana	Deputies responded to a fight at a club and chased and handcuffed a man. Witnesses say Galmon approached the deputies when one of them shot him. An attorney for Galmon's family stated he was approaching them to say they were stopping the wrong person.
August 11, 2012	Christopher Middleton	23	Maywood, Illinois	An off-duty Chicago cop strike Middleton's four-year-old daughter, Tania Middleton, and 18-year-old cousin, John Passley, with his motorcycle in the 1100 block of South 1st Avenue. Middleton then approached the accident scene and, along with Passley, begin fighting the cop, to which the cop drew a gun and shot Middleton.
August 12, 2012	Bobby Moore	15	Little Rock, Arkansas	Responding to car break-ins, Officer Josh Hastings shot Moore as he was in a vehicle with two other teenagers. Hastings claimed he thought the vehicle was about to hit him, while the other teenagers claimed they were trying to reverse away. Hastings was charged with manslaughter but juries deadlocked twice.
August 31, 2012	Mark Henderson	19	Woodbury, Minnesota	Henderson and several other people were in a hotel room when another man, Demetrius Ballinger, pulled out a gun and held Henderson and the others hostage. After police arrived, Henderson attempted to flee the room and was shot by officers who mistook him for the gunman.
September 2, 2012	Mario Romero	23	Vallejo, California	Officers Sean Kenney and Dustin Joseph approached a Ford Thunderbird where Romero and his brother-in-law were sitting and fired, hitting both men. Kenney then jumped on the hood of the car and continued firing. Joseph told detectives Romero exited his vehicle and had a gun in his waistband. No weapons were found, although Kenney stated he recovered a pellet gun from the vehicle. Kenney had shot Anton Barrett earlier in the year, and later shot a third unarmed man, Jeremiah Moore, in October.
September 8, 2012	Carleton Wallace	30	Alexander, Arkansas	A rookie officer, Nancy Cummings, approached Wallace as he walked down a road with a gun tucked in his pants. After having him throw the gun into the woods, Cummings was arresting Wallace when Wallace suddenly turned around, causing the officer's gun to go off. Cummings was charged with manslaughter but was acquitted.
September 21, 2012	Anthony Anderson	46	Baltimore, Maryland	Anderson died after he was tackled by an officer who suspected him of involvement in a drug deal, during which he slipped drugs down his mouth. A coroner determined Anderson's death was a homicide, and an autopsy showed he had fractured ribs and a ruptured spline.
September 29, 2012	Sherron Norman	37	Haddon Township, New Jersey	Police arrested Norman and placed him in his stomach in the backseat of a cruiser. After a minute, Norman fell unconscious and died. A medical examiner hired by Norman's family stated his death was a homicide.
November 8, 2012	Dakota Bright	15	Chicago, Illinois	While responding to false reports of a burglary, Officer Brandon Ternand saw Bright allegedly holding a gun in an alley. Following a chase Ternand shot Bright when he turned and reached towards his waistband. While a gun was found in a yard near where the chase began, Bright was unarmed when he was shot.
November 18, 2012	Derrick Ambrose Jr.	22	Waterloo, Iowa	After an argument at a bar, Ambrose left and returned with a pistol. An officer chased Ambrose, during which Ambrose threw his gun over a fence. When Ambrose tripped, the officer shot him as he rose and turned towards the officer.
November 29, 2012	Timothy Russell	43	East Cleveland, Ohio	Timothy Russell and Malissa Williams were shot by six police officers after a 22-minute car chase, in part by police who thought they were being shot at from the vehicle. Only one police officer involved, Officer Michael Brelo, lost their job with the police department. None were found guilty of a crime, either by having their charges dismissed or after being found not guilty.
November 29, 2012	Malissa Williams	30	East Cleveland, Ohio	Timothy Russell and Malissa Williams were shot by six police officers after a 22-minute car chase, in part by police who thought they were being shot at from the vehicle. Only one police officer involved, Officer Michael Brelo, lost their job with the police department. None were found guilty of a crime, either by having their charges dismissed or after being found not guilty.
December 2, 2012	Darnesha Harris	16	Breaux Bridge, Louisiana	Police were dispatched after a report of a fight. Harris, who was attempting to flee the fight, collided with a squad car, a parked car and a bystander. Breaux Bridge officer Travis Guillot then shot and killed Harris. A grand jury refused to indict Guillot.
December 6, 2012	Shelly Frey	26	Houston, Texas	Frey and two other women reportedly shoplifted Walmart supercenter. Harris County sheriff deputy Louis Campbell, who was working security, confronted the women at the door and one of the women allegedly struck him with her purse before fleeing to a vehicle. Campbell caught up to the car and allegedly told Frey and the other women to get out of the vehicle. They did not, and when Flay attempted to drive away, Campbell fired his gun into the car, striking Frey in the neck. Frey was able to drive to a nearby apartment complex, where she died.
December 15, 2012	Jamaal Moore	23	Chicago, Illinois	Moore was suspected of hijacking televisions from a truck. After a chase a police vehicle struck Moore and dragged him several feet. As Moore crawled out from under the car, an officer tackled him, and a second shot him.
December 22, 2012	Kerwin Harris	39	St. Louis, Missouri	An officer tackled and restrained Harris after mistaking him for a robbery suspect. Another officer tased him. His death was declared an accident, but other medical experts who reviewed his death said it should have been declared a homicide.
January 7, 2013	Cedrick Chatman	17	Chicago, Illinois	Following a carjacking an officer shot Chatman as he ran away. The officer stated he believed Chatman was holding a gun, which was actually a black iPhone box.
January 18, 2013	Jayvis Benjamin	20	Avondale Estates, Georgia	An officer pursued Benjamin for a stolen car, ending with the car crashing. The officer and Benjamin fought, and the officer shot Benjamin. A grand jury recommended the officer be indicted for the shooting, but the District Attorney chose not to bring charges against the officer.
March 10, 2013	Clinton Allen	25	Dallas, Texas	Officer Clark Staller shot Allen seven times at an apartment complex. Staller claimed Allen tried to choke him.
March 12, 2013	Kimani Gray	16	New York City, New York	Gray was shot and killed after he allegedly reached into his waistband, but a witness said Gray was unarmed. A gun was recovered at the scene, but Gray's fingerprints or DNA did not match what was recovered from the gun.
March 13, 2013	Willie Lee Bingham Jr.	20	Cleveland, Mississippi	Deputy Walter Grant and other officers pursued Bingham in a vehicle for breaking into an auto parts plant. When Bingham's vehicle stopped, he exited and ran into a field, where Grant shot him. A baton was found near Bingham, but an investigation determined it had been planted by Grant to make it appear as if Bingham was armed. Grant faced two mistrials on charges of manslaughter, and a federal evidence-tampering case was dismissed due to sickness.
April 20, 2013	Craig Demps	22	West Palm Beach, Florida	Following a carjacking an officer shot Demps when he reached towards his waistband. Demps did not have a weapon, but narcotics.
May 1, 2013	Jordan West-Morson	26	Detroit, Michigan	An officer with the Detroit Transportation Corporation argued with West-Morson, who was selling CDs outside a gas station. At some point a fist fight broke out and the officer, Robert Tyus, shot West-Morson. Tyus was charged with manslaughter but was acquitted.
May 24, 2013	Leonard Thomas	30	Fife, Washington	A SWAT sniper shot and killed Thomas as he held his son during a standoff.
June 8, 2013	Micah Key	24	San Angelo, Texas	Police tased Key multiple times as they attempted to get him into custody. He fell unresponsive and died. An autopsy determined his death was partially caused by the taser use and the altercation with police.
July 18, 2013	Tyrone West	44	Baltimore, Maryland	Police beat and pepper sprayed West after he fled a traffic stop. An initial autopsy stated he died from a heart condition, but a later review concluded he died from positional asphyxia while restrained.
July 25, 2013	Dainell Simmons	29	Middle Island, New York	Police were called to a group home where Simmons, who had autism and was non-verbal, was upset over other residents getting funnel cake. Although Simmons had calmed down by the time officers arrived, they attempted to take him to a psychiatric ward. Officers tased and restrained Simmons, who died from asphyxiation. A lawsuit was settled in 2018.
July 26, 2013	Larry Jackson	32	Austin, Texas	Investigating a bank robbery, Detective Charles Kleinert chased Jackson and caught up to him, causing a struggle. During the struggle, Kleinert's weapon discharged, striking Jackson in the back of the neck. Kleinert was charged with manslaughter but the charge was dropped.
July 28, 2013	Ryan Stokes	24	Kansas City, Missouri	Officer William Thompson shot Stokes after he was accused of stealing a cell phone. The officer said stokes was believed Stokes had a gun, but he was holding his own cell phone.
July 31, 2013	Jermaine McBean	33	Oakland Park, Florida	After buying an air rifle at a pawn shop, police were called as McBean walked along a busy road holding the air rifle. Outside his apartment complex, deputies yelled for McBean to drop the air rifle, and shot him when he turned around. Deputy Peter Peraza was charged with manslaughter but a judge ruled he could claim he felt threatened under the "stand-your-ground" law.
September 13, 2013	Dontrell Stephens	20	West Palm Beach, Florida	Deputy Adams Lin stopped Stephens as he rode a bicycle. Stephens ran away and Lin shot him after mistaking his cellphone for a weapon. Stephens became paralyzed as a result of the shooting, winning a multimillion-dollar lawsuit against the Palm Beach County Sheriff's Office. In September 2021, Stephens died at the age of 28 due to complications from his paralysis.
September 14, 2013	Jonathan Ferrell	24	Charlotte, North Carolina	After crashing his car, Ferrell went to a house and knocked on the door. The resident, Sarah McCartney, called the police and three officers came. Ferrell then ran towards them, whereupon one of the officers fired a taser at Ferrell and missed. Kerrick then opened fire on Ferrell, shooting him twelve times and killing him. He was unarmed at the time he was shot. A toxicology test of Ferrell's blood showed he was not illegally intoxicated.
September 29, 2013	Alexander Jamar Marion	19	Asheville, North Carolina	Police responding to a home burglarly encountered Marion, who was armed with a gun, exiting the building. After a chase through a nearby forest, an officer shot him as he exited the woods. Although Marion had been armed with a gun that had been fired once when the chase started, he had dropped it in the woods during the pursuit and did not have a weapon when he was shot.
October 13, 2013	Brandon Devone Smith	30	Wilmington, North Carolina	Smith, suspected of shooting a deputy several days earlier, was shot and killed by deputies and ATF agents after a chase. Smith was unarmed at the time.
October 15, 2013	Cameron Massey	26	Eufaula, Alabama	Police pulled over a vehicle where Massey was a passenger. While officers questioned the driver, an officer ran back towards the car and shot when it began moving forwards. The other officer, believing Massey had fired the first shot, fired four more times. All five bullets struck Massey, who was sitting in the passengers seat.
November 11, 2013	Abdul Kamal	30	Irvington, New Jersey	Police responded after Kamal broke into his ex-wife's home. Police shot Kamal after he refused to remove his hand from his pocket, with sources saying Kamal had implied he had a weapon.
November 19, 2013	Tyler Woods	19	Long Beach, California	Following a traffic stop Woods fled and was found on the roof of an apartment building. After Woods took a kneeling stance facing the officers, police shot him. No weapons were recovered from the scene.

== 2014 ==
Total for 2014: 33

Date	Name	Age	City	Description
January 16	Jordan Baker	26	Houston, Texas	An off-duty officer shot Baker after mistaking him for a robbery suspect. Baker was not the robbery suspect and was unarmed at the time.
February 9	Ernest Satterwhite	68	North Augusta, South Carolina	After a slow-speed chase that ended in Satterwhite's driveway Officer Justin Craven lunged into Satterwhite's vehicle, before pulling back and shooting him. Craven pled guilty to misconduct in office and was sentenced to three years of probation and 80 hours of community service.
February 14	D'Andre Berghardt	20	Red Rock Canyon, Nevada	Park rangers from the Bureau of Land Management (BLM) responded to reports that Berghardt was obstructing cyclists. After rangers arrived, Berghardt and the rangers scuffled, deploying pepper spray, a taser, and batons. Rangers eventually shot Berghardt when he attempted to enter a BLM vehicle that had a rifle inside it, though Berghardt himself was unarmed.
February 16	Yvette Smith	47	Bastrop, Texas	Smith called 911 and was acting as a peacemaker during a dispute between two men. Deputy Daniel Willis arrived and ordered Smith to step outside. Within three seconds of Smith opening the door, Willis shot her twice. Willis was charged with murder but was found not guilty.
March 25	Deandre Lloyd Armstrong-Starks	27	Tulsa, Oklahoma	Sergeant Mark Wollmershauser Jr. shot and killed Armstrong–Starks in the back at a residence after he "kept moving his hands in a furtive motion in the front of his hoodie and waistband area". No weapons were found in the home.
April 11	Gregory Towns	24	East Point, Georgia	Officers Marcus Eberhart and Howard Weems, both black, repeatedly tased Towns as he was handcuffed, leading to his death. Eberhart was sentenced to life in prison, while Weems was sentenced to five years in prison.
April 16	Arthur Green Jr.	63	Tampa, Florida	Green, who was having a diabetic emergency, died after police restrained him. An independent autopsy stated restraint asphyxia was Green's primary cause of death.
May 5	Justin Griffin	25	Jackson, Mississippi	Griffin fought with an off-duty Hinds County deputy acting as a referee at a basketball game. The deputy, Joshua Adams, struck Griffin in the head, killing him. Adams was charged with murder.
May 8	Howard Bowe	34	Hallandale Beach, Florida	A SWAT officer shot Bowe while police served a warrant at his home. Bowe died 11 days later. Bowe's pet pit bull was also shot and killed.
May 14	George King Jr	19	Baltimore, Maryland	King died after an officer tased him during an altercation at MedStar Good Samaritan Hospital.
May 22	Craig McKinnis	44	Kansas City, Kansas	McKinnis died of positional asphyxia after being restrained. His death was ruled accidental.
July 1	Jerry Dwight Brown	41	Zephyrhills, Florida	Two detectives shot Brown during a drug bust after he refused to show his hands.
July 4	Icarus Randolph	26	Wichita, Kansas	Officer Ryan Snyder shot and killed Randolph on his mother's lawn after he charged towards the officer.
July 9	Charles Goodridge	53	Cypress, Texas	An off-duty constable working security at an apartment had an altercation with Goodridge, who had been recently evicted from the property. The constable shot Goodridge twice in the abdomen. The constable was treated for a concussion.
July 13	Ronald Singleton	45	New York City, New York	Singleton died after being restrained by police in Manhattan. His death was ruled a homicide. Singleton's death occurred four days before the death of Eric Garner, who similarly died after he was restrained by NYPD officers.
July 16	Dominique Lewis	23	Flint Township, Michigan	Police pulled a vehicle over for speeding on Flushing Road near Eldorado Street in Flint Township, Michigan. After claiming to smell marijuana inside the vehicle, police had the driver, her daughter, and a passenger removed. Lewis, who was sitting in the back seat, then climbed into the driver's seat and tried to drive away. Officer Matthew Needham sidestepped the vehicle and fired two shots at Lewis. Lewis's family filed a federal lawsuit the following year. The township approved payment of $1.39 million to Lewis's family.
July 17	Eric Garner	43	New York City, New York	Eric Garner died after a New York City Police Department officer, Daniel Pantaleo, put him in a chokehold while arresting him. Garner repeated the words "I can't breathe" 11 times while lying face down on the sidewalk. The medical examiner ruled Garner's death a homicide. No indictment followed.
July 22	Briatay McDuffie	19	White Marsh, Maryland	During a foot-pursuit, an altercation occurred, in which McDuffie was shot and killed. McDuffie was wanted for car theft.
August 5	John Crawford III	22	Beavercreek, Ohio	Crawford was a 22-year-old man shot and killed by Beavercreek police officer Sean Williams, in a Walmart store in Beavercreek, Ohio, near Dayton, while holding an un-packaged BB/pellet air rifle from inside the store's sporting goods section. A grand jury declined to indict the two officers on criminal charges. Ohio is an "open carry" state, in which the open carrying of firearms is legal with or without a license, which prompted discussion of gun rights and race. Following the shooting, a grand jury decided not to indict any of the officers involved on charges of either murder, reckless homicide, or negligent homicide.
August 9	Michael Brown	18	Ferguson, Missouri	After an incident in officer Darren Wilson's police car in which Wilson discharged his gun, Brown began to flee on foot. Officer Wilson pursued the unarmed Brown. Brown then stopped and turned to face Wilson, who then shot Brown six times, killing Brown. Brown's death is attributed to a fatal gun shot wound to his head. Less than 90 seconds passed from the time Wilson encountered Brown to the time of Brown's death. Brown's body remained in the street for about four hours, unmoved by Ferguson's authorities. No charges were filed against Wilson due to conflicting witness statements.
August 11	Ezell Ford	25	Los Angeles, California	Ezell Ford died from multiple gunshot wounds after being shot by Los Angeles Police Department (LAPD) officers. After his death, his parents said their son had been diagnosed with depression, bipolar disorder, and schizophrenia, and that everybody in the neighborhood, as well as the police, were aware of this. They recalled that Ford had become more introverted and melancholy around the age of 18, and took medication that made him less active. In January 2017 Los Angeles County prosecutors said Wampler and Villegas would not face criminal charges in connection with the shooting.
August 13	Cory Tanner	24	Bunnell, Florida	U.S. Marshals served a warrant on Tanner in relation with an earlier shooting. After fifteen minutes at a home Tanner charged the back door holding a black bottle of cologne, and marshals shot him.
September 10	Darrien Hunt	22	Saratoga Springs, Utah	Police shot Hunt while responding to reports of a man with a samurai sword, later found to be a replica. Hunt's family found sketches of manga-like characters and scenes, suggesting Hunt was cosplaying a character when he was killed. A lawyer for Hunt's family said he was shot in the back.
September 23	Cameron Tillman	14	Houma, Louisiana	Police were called about "armed men with guns" entering an abandoned home, but they were actually teenagers with BB guns. When deputies arrived, Tillman answered the door and was shot four times. The county sheriff initially said Tillman had a gun, but later said there was a BB gun "in close proximity". The other teens stated the BB gun was on a table next to the door.
September 28	Oliver Gregoire	26	Baytown, Texas	Police responded to Gregoire's home in connection with reports he tried to stop vehicles on the highway and attacked a woman at his home. When officers arrived Gregoire charged at one them, who tased him. Gregoire ripped the probes off, and the officer tased him again. He fell unresponsive and died at the hospital.
October 3	Lashano Gilbert	31	New London, Connecticut	Police tased Gilbert as he was arrested for an attempted carjacking and assault. After he was transported from the hospital to the police department, he began to fold his pants into the shape of a noose. Police used pepper spray and a taser on Gilbert, who became unresponsive while being transported back to the hospital. An autopsy conducted on October 5 determined Gilbert's death was a homicide.
October 23	Michael Ricardo Minor	38	Suitland, Maryland	A deputy responding to a domestic incident shot and killed Minor, who police say was unarmed.
November 13	Tanisha Anderson	37	Cleveland, Ohio	At around 8:15 P.M, Anderson's family called police because Anderson was going through a mental health crisis. When Cleveland Police officers handcuffed Anderson and attempted to place Anderson inside the back of a patrol car, Anderson allegedly resisted. A scuffle ensued and somehow Anderson ended up on the ground. Cuyahoga County Sheriff investigators estimated Anderson was on the ground for about 21 minutes. Anderson was later taken to Cleveland Clinic where she was pronounced dead the next day at 12:30 A.M. No officer was charged in connection to Anderson's death.
November 20	Akai Gurley	28	New York City, New York	Gurley and his girlfriend entered the stairwell in the building where they lived. Officer Liang fired his weapon; his shot ricocheted off a wall and fatally struck Gurley in the chest. Officer Peter Liang was indicted by a grand jury for manslaughter, assault, and other criminal charges (five counts total).
November 22	Tamir Rice	12	Cleveland, Ohio	The twelve-year-old Rice was carrying an airsoft gun. Officer Timothy Loehmann shot him almost on sight despite the 911 caller twice indicating that the gun was "probably fake" and saying that "he is probably a juvenile"; however, this information was not relayed to officers Loehmann or Garmback on the initial dispatch. The 911 dispatcher was suspended for 8 days.
December 2	Rumain Brisbon	34	Phoenix, Arizona	An officer shot and killed Brisbon during a struggle after mistaking a pill bottle for a gun.
December 15	Dennis Grigsby	35	Texarkana, Texas	Officer Brent Lawing responded to a burglary report and shot Grigsby, who was carrying a metal spoon. A grand jury declined to indict Lawing.
December 30	Jerame Reid	36	Bridgeton, New Jersey	During a traffic stop, officers pulled over a vehicle for running through a stop sign. While questioning the two men in the car, including Jerame Reid, officer Days, who recognized Reid, removed large silver handgun from the glove compartment. Then there was a struggle and Reid then pushed the door open and exited the car with his hands at chest level. Days backed up and fired as Reid exited the vehicle. Reid reacted to the shots by moving his hands upwards. Officer Worley fired one shot, and Reid was killed. Reid was unarmed at the time. No charges were filed against the two officers involved in the shooting.

== 2015 ==
Total for 2015: 40

Date	Name	Age	City	Description
January 8	Artago Howard	36	Strong, Arkansas	A deputy responded to an alarm at a pharmacy and encountered Howard. The two briefly struggled, and the deputy shot Howard. Howard fled the pharmacy and died outside before an ambulance arrived.
February 8	Natasha McKenna	37	Alexandria, Virginia	McKenna died from being tasered (while shackled). This caused her to go into cardiac arrest.
February 24	Calvon Reid	39	Coconut Creek, Florida	Police were called to a retirement complex and encountered Reid. The police chief stated that Reid was agitated and incoherent, leading officers to use stun guns, although one witness said that Reid had earlier calmly asked him for a ride to the hospital. Other witnesses said officers hit Reid while he was handcuffed on the ground, and another said that Reid yelled "I can't breathe" before he fell unconscious and died. His death was ruled a homicide. The police chief was forced to resign as a result of Reid's death.
March 1	Charley Leundeu Keunang	43	Los Angeles, California	Charley Leundeu Keunang was ordered by police to come out of his tent in Skid Row after fighting with someone inside the tent. After he refused the police order, they dragged him out of the tent. A physical altercation ensued with several police officers, during which three officers shot Keunang, resulting in his death. At least two videos captured the incident. According to police, Keunang took an officer's gun during the struggle. While no charges were filed against the officers, the city paid a settlement of $1.95 million to Keunang's family.
March 6	Tony Robinson	19	Madison, Wisconsin	Friends of Tony Robinson were concerned by his erratic behavior and called for help. Robinson was determined post-mortem to have ingested Xanax, psilocybin mushrooms, and THC hours before the shooting. Officer Matthew Kenny arrived and, less than a minute later, fired his weapon seven times. Robinson was unarmed.
March 6	Naeschylus Vinzant	37	Aurora, Colorado	Vinzant, suspected of kidnapping, robbery, assault, and also wanted for removing his parole ankle bracelet, was shot and killed by a SWAT team. Vinzant was unarmed.
March 9	Anthony Hill	26	Chamblee, Georgia	Hill was noted to be acting erratically when police were called; he had hung from his second-story balcony in his apartment complex, and his speech was slurred. Officer Robert Olsen and found him in the parking lot of the complex. After Hill approached Olsen, who had exited the vehicle, and refused to obey orders, Olsen shot Hill twice. Olsen was sentenced on November 1, 2019, to 12 years in prison, followed by eight years of probation by DeKalb County Superior Court Judge LaTisha Dear Jackson. Olsen is also banned for life from working in law enforcement, prohibited from possessing firearms or profiting from the case. The Georgia Court of Appeals overturned the 2019 conviction of former DeKalb County police officer Robert "Chip" Olsen in March 2024, ruling that the trial court erred by allowing the department's use-of-force policy to be used as evidence. Prosecutors said they would appeal.
March 15	Brandon Jones	18	Cleveland, Ohio	While investigating a burglary at a store, Officer Alan Buford and his partner grabbed Jones after he emerged with items stolen from the store. Buford then fired a single shot into Jones's chest, killing him. Buford was charged with negligent homicide but was acquitted.
March 24	Nicholas Thomas	23	Smyrna, Georgia	An officer shot Thomas at a Goodyear store as he sat in the driver's seat of a customer's car. Police stated Thomas drove towards officers when he was shot, although an autopsy found he was shot from behind.
April 2	Eric Harris	44	Tulsa, Oklahoma	Eric Courtney Harris was fatally shot during an undercover sting in Tulsa, Oklahoma, as Harris ran from authorities unarmed. While Harris was being subdued, Tulsa County Reserve Deputy Robert Charles "Bob" Bates, 73, allegedly confused his personal weapon for a taser. Bates shot Harris in the back when he was on the ground. According to the Tulsa County Sheriff's office, he immediately said afterward, "Oh, I shot him! I'm sorry." Bates was found guilty of manslaughter and sentenced to four years in prison.
April 2	Donald "Dontay" Ivy	39	Albany, New York	Police tased Ivy multiple times during a scuffle. He died, and his death was ruled a homicide.
April 4	Walter Scott	50	North Charleston, South Carolina	Walter Scott was pulled over for a non-functioning brake light by police officer Michael Slager. After Slager returned to his vehicle, Scott exited his own vehicle and fled on foot. After a brief altercation, Scott ran again and Slager fired eight shots at him from behind, hitting Scott five times. Slager was convicted in federal court of second-degree murder in 2017 and sentenced to 20 years in prison.
April 12	Freddie Gray	25	Baltimore, Maryland	Gray was arrested by the Baltimore Police Department and subsequently charged for possessing a knife. While being transported in a police van, Gray fell into a coma and was taken to the R Adams Cowley Shock Trauma Center. Gray died April 19, 2015; his death was ascribed to injuries to his spinal cord. Four officers were involved; all were either acquitted or did not have charges brought against them.
April 15	Frank Shephard	41	Houston, Texas	Police pursued Shephard for "suspicious activity". After he crashed at an intersection, police shot Shephard when he reached back into the car. No weapons were found in the vehicle.
April 19	Norman Cooper	33	San Antonio, Texas	Police responded to a family disturbance call and encountered Cooper. Two officers tased Cooper several times; he fell unconscious and died at the scene.
April 22	William Chapman	18	Portsmouth, Virginia	Portsmouth Police Officer Stephen D. Rankin had been responding to a report of suspected shoplifting and engaged in a physical struggle with Chapman while trying to arrest him. According to witnesses, Chapman broke free but then stepped back towards Rankin, at which point Rankin shot him twice. Rankin was found guilty of voluntary manslaughter and served 30 months in prison.
April 25	David Felix	24	New York City, New York	Two detectives encountered Felix at his apartment while investigating a purse theft. After a chase down the fire escape, the officers and Felix fought, with one shooting Felix after he grabbed a police radio and hit an officer in the head with it.
May 5	Brandon Glenn	29	Los Angeles, California	Officer Clifford Proctor stepped back and shot Glenn during an altercation with another officer, stating he believed Glenn was reaching for his partner's gun. Although the Los Angeles Police Chief Charlie Beck recommended Proctor be charged, the District Attorney's office declined to file charges against the officer. A later DA charged Proctor in 2024, and he was arrested in 2025.
May 12	D'Angelo Stallworth	28	Jacksonville, Florida	While officers served an eviction warrant Stallworth picked up a gun and fought with police before fleeing. At some point Stallworth dropped the gun onto a porch and ran down a flight of stairs. When Stallworth turned to look at the officers, police shot him.
May 30	Richard Gregory Davis	50	Rochester, New York	Police tased Davis after he charged at them following a chase. Davis died, and his death was ruled a homicide by a medical examiner.
June 15	Kris Jackson	22	South Lake Tahoe, California	An officer shot Jackson as he attempted to exit a hotel room through a back window.
June 25	Spencer Lee McCain	41	Owings Mills, Maryland	Police responding to a domestic disturbance shot McCain after he took a "defensive position".
July 2	Victo Larosa III	23	Jacksonville, Florida	An officer shot Larosa during a drug sting after he reached towards his waistband. No gun was recovered from the scene.
July 8	Jonathan Sanders	39	Stonewall, Mississippi	At the time of the incident, witnesses reported that the officer had used a racial slur during his encounter with Sanders and that Sanders' breathing had been obstructed by officer Kevin Herrington for as much as 30 minutes. Sanders died at the scene.
July 17	Darrius Stewart	19	Memphis, Tennessee	During a traffic stop, Officer Connor Schilling shot Stewart three times following a struggle, twice in the chest and once in the back. Although District Attorney Amy Weirich recommended manslaughter charges against Schilling, a grand jury declined to indict him.
July 19	Samuel DuBose	43	Cincinnati, Ohio	Samuel DuBose was fatally shot by Ray Tensing, a University of Cincinnati police officer, during a traffic stop for a missing front license plate and a suspended driver's license. Tensing fired after DuBose started his car. He was tried twice for murder and voluntary manslaughter but both trials ended in hung juries. Charges against him were later dismissed with prejudice.
August 7	Christian Taylor	19	Arlington, Texas	Officer Brad Miller shot and killed Taylor responding to a burglary at a car dealership.
August 28	Felix Kumi	61	Mount Vernon, New York	During a gun-buy operation an undercover officer was robbed by a man named Alvin Smothers, who pointed a BB gun at the officer. The officer fired at Smothers, instead hitting Kumi, who was walking to pick his car up from a repair store. Smothers was charged with Kumi's death but was acquitted.
September 5	India Kager	27	Virginia Beach, Virginia	Police followed Kager and her child's father, Antonio Perry, who police were investigating for a murder. When their car stopped at a 7-Eleven, police used flash grenades and broke the windows. Perry fired at police, and police fired back, killing both Kager and Perry. Kager and Perry's four-month-old son was sitting in the back of the car.
September 21	Adrien Campbell	24	Lubbock, Texas	Police searched for Campbell after a detective witnessed him allegedly hit a woman. When police found him a physical struggle occurred. He was taken to a hospital, where he died. His death was ruled a homicide.
September 23	Keith McLeod	19	Reisterstown, Maryland	Police were called to a pharmacy after McLeod attempted to buy cough syrup with a fake prescription. According to witnesses, McLeod threatened to kill officers. Video shows he then pointed a finger gun at an officer, who fired.
October 20	Paterson Brown Jr.	18	Chesterfield County, Virginia	Paterson Brown Jr. was killed after an altercation at a car wash. The police officer who shot him was ordered to serve 3 months in jail in 2017.
November 13	Tanisha Anderson	37	Cleveland, Ohio	Tanisha Anderson was killed by Officer Scott Aldridge during a 911 mental health call made by Anderson's family. Anderson was restrained in a prone position – family members claimed Aldridge placed a knee on her neck – and stopped breathing, and she was pronounced dead at Cleveland Hospital. Aldridge received a 10-day suspension.
November 19	Nathaniel Harris Pickett Jr.	29	Barstow, California	Deputy Kyle Woods shot and killed Pickett at a motel after he fell to the ground and was scooting back.
December 8	Miguel Espinal	36	Yonkers, New York	Following a pursuit, police shot Espinal during a fight in a wooded area. Police claim Espinal had tried to grab one of their weapons.
December 19	Roy Lee Nelson Jr.	42	Hayward, California	Police restrained Nelson, who had schizophrenia, while waiting for an ambulance to arrive. Nelson fell unconscious and died.
December 21	Michael Noel	32	Saint Martinville, Louisiana	Police were called to Michael Noel's home after he exhibited a mental health episode, and after the cops attempted to put the other handcuff, he resisted.
December 23	Kevin Matthews	35	Detroit, Michigan	A Dearborn officer chased and shot Matthews, who had a history of mental illness and was recovering from a broken arm, after he was accused of stealing an energy drink. In a deposition the officer said that Matthews was above him and trying to take his gun, leading him to fire nine times. Crime scene and ballistics experts hired by Matthews' family disputed this, stating that the officer was most likely firing downwards, as two bullets were found under Matthews' body and another next to it. The district attorney declined to file charges.
December 26	Bettie Jones	55	Chicago, Illinois	Officer Robert Rialmo shot and killed 19-year-old Quintonio LeGrier, who was armed with a bat. One of the shots struck Jones, LeGrier's neighbor.
December 31	Keith Childress	23	Las Vegas, Nevada	Las Vegas Metro Police were called by US Marshals to help conduct surveillance. Police shot Childress after his cell phone was mistaken for a gun.

== 2016 ==
Total for 2016: 26

Date	Name	Age	City	Description
February 4	Antronie Scott	36	San Antonio, Texas	Officer John Lee shot and killed Scott in San Antonio's North Side after ‘mistaking’ a cell phone Scott was holding for a gun.
February 5	Wendell Celestine	37	Antioch, California	Two officers attempted to arrest Celestine, who had left a hospital against guidance after an arrest. When the two officers struggled with him, one put Celestine in a carotid hold, which resulted in Celestine's death.
February 8	David Joseph	17	Austin, Texas	Police responded to reports of a teenager chasing a man around an apartment complex and encountered Joseph, naked and unarmed. Officer Geoffrey Freeman shot Joseph after he allegedly charged towards him.
February 13	Calin Devonte Roquemore	23	Beckville, Texas	Texas Department of Public Safety Trooper Daniel McBride shot and killed Roquemore during a chase after Roquemore tripped. McBride stated he believed Roquemore had a gun.
February 21	Che Taylor	46	Seattle, Washington	Officers Michael Spaulding and Todd Miller shot and killed Taylor in a car outside a home in the Wedgwood neighborhood. Evidence showed Taylor did not have a gun on him during the shooting.
February 24	Christopher Davis	21	East Troy, Wisconsin	Davis accompanied two friends to a parking lot where he was told they would be checking out a car. When a squad car pulled into the lot, one of the men told Davis and the driver, Jose Lara, that they were actually there for a drug deal. As Lara attempted to drive away an officer fired, hitting Davis. No weapons were found in the vehicle.
February 25	Greg Gunn	58	Montgomery, Alabama	Officer Aaron Cody Smith shot and killed Greg Gunn after he fled a stop-and-frisk search. Smith claimed Gunn had attacked him with a pole, but his fingerprints were not found on the pole, and photographs showed Gunn had a hat in his hands. Smith was found guilty of manslaughter.
March 12	Peter Gaines	35	Houston, Texas	Police responded after Gaines, who police said may have been on PCP, was reported damaging a street sign. An officer tazed then shot Gaines after he allegedly walked towards police.
April 5	Kevin Hicks	44	Indianapolis, Indiana	An officer shot Hicks in the head after an altercation at a gas station. According to The Indianapolis Star Hicks' death was one of 19 police shootings that the Indianapolis Metropolitan Police Department failed to review.
April 11	Mary Truxillo	72	Jefferson Parish, Louisiana	Deputy Jean Fritz-Cadet crashed into Mary Truxillo's car whilst crossing an intersection, with Truxillo dying at the scene of the accident. Fritz-Cadet was not driving with lights and sirens despite exceeding the speed limit.
April 23	Demarcus Semer	21	Fort Pierce, Florida	Police pulled Semer over for speeding. When an officer tried to remove Semer from the vehicle he started to drive away. According to police, one officer was knocked over by the vehicle and another jumped into the vehicle. The officer who fell then fired, believing the other officer was about to be run over.
April 28	Ashtian Barnes	24	Bellaire, Texas	A Harris County Precinct 5 Constable pulled Barnes over while he drove a rental car. After Constable R. Felix asked Barnes if there was marijuana in the vehicle and told him to open the trunk, which he did. Then as Barnes began to drive away Felix jumped on the side of the car and shot him. A grand jury declined to filed charges against the constable.
May 19	Jessica Williams	29	San Francisco, California	Police attempted to detain Williams after a license plate reader determined the vehicle she was driving was stolen. As officers approached, Williams drove forward and hit a parked truck, backed up, and drove forward again, becoming wedged between the truck and a fence. A police sergeant then opened fire, striking Williams. San Francisco Police Chief Greg Suhr resigned hours after the shooting.
May 22	Vernell Bing Jr.	22	Jacksonville, Florida	Police pursued Bing after he was suspected of a series of shootings. After Bing crashed he exited his vehicle. As he walked towards an officer the officer shot at Bing five times, killing him.
June 23	Deravis Caine Rogers	22	Atlanta, Georgia	An officer responded to reports of a suspicious person at an apartment complex and encountered Rogers in a vehicle. When the officer pulled in front of Rogers' car, Rogers continued around the vehicle. The officer shot into the passenger side, killing Rogers. The officer was charged with murder.
July 4	Delrawn Small	37	New York City, New York	After a driving dispute in Brooklyn, off-duty officer Wayne Isaacs shot Small with his service weapon when Small approached Isaacs's driver side window. Isaacs initially claimed Small assaulted him but security camera video contradicted his claim. Isaacs faced disciplinary charges in connection with the incident.
July 27	Dalvin Hollins	19	Tempe, Arizona	Officer Ed Ouimette shot Hollis, suspected of an armed robbery, in a parking lot. Ouimette claimed Hollins had a gun but no gun was ever found.
July 28	Paul O'Neal	18	Chicago, Illinois	Police say that O'Neal, who was unarmed, fled from the vehicle after the chase and refused to stop. The shooting was classified by the medical examiner as a homicide. The three officers who discharged their weapons were removed from duty following a preliminary investigation. Following an investigation, no criminal charges were brought against the officers involved.
July 28	Donnell Thompson Jr.	27	Compton, California	Deputies responded after Thompson was mistaken for a carjacking suspect while lying in a man's yard. After several commands and a flash-bang failed to wake him, police used foam bullets, which woke Thompson up. Thompson then ran towards a SWAT vehicle with his hand near his waistband, and a SWAT officer shot him.
August 13	Sylville Smith	23	Milwaukee, Wisconsin	Smith was shot after throwing his firearm over a fence while being pursued by police during a foot pursuit. The officer who shot him was acquitted of reckless homicide.
August 30	Levonia Riggins	22	Palm River-Clair Mel, Florida	A SWAT team served a warrant on Riggins for selling marijuana. When Riggins awoke and moved between his bed and a wall, Deputy Caleb Johnson shot him. Johnson stated he believed Riggins was reaching for a weapon when his hand moved near his waistband.
September 11	Terrence Sterling	31	Washington, D.C.	Police pursued Sterling, riding a motorcycle, for a traffic violation. An officer shot Sterling after he rode his motorcycle into the side of a police cruiser. The department said Sterling had done so intentionally, while witnesses said they believed the crash was unavoidable. An internal review board found Officer Brian Trainer violated department policy and recommended he be fired.
September 16	Terence Crutcher	40	Tulsa, Oklahoma	Terence Crutcher was shot and killed by police officer Betty Jo Shelby in Tulsa, Oklahoma. He was unarmed during the encounter, in which he was standing near his vehicle in the middle of a street. Shelby was charged with first-degree manslaughter after the shooting was labeled a homicide. On May 17, 2017, a jury found her not guilty of first-degree manslaughter.
September 18	Tawon Boyd	21	Middle River, Maryland	Boyd called police during a dispute with his girlfriend. When police arrived, Boyd fled to a nearby home, where police beat and restrained him. He was taken to the hospital, where he later died. His death was initially ruled an accident, but a 2025 audit found it should have been ruled a homicide.
September 27	Alfred Olango	38	El Cajon, California	Olango was shot several times by police responding to a call for emergency psychiatric aid. San Diego County prosecutors declined to file charges against officers Josh McDaniel and Richard Gonsalves, who were involved in the shooting. Olango's sister noticed strange behavior from him and called police three times asking for immediate help. A 5150 (involuntary psychiatric hold) request for a psychiatric emergency response team (PERT) was placed. Fifty minutes after the first call, at least two non-PERT officers arrived on scene. In video footage released by Police Department, Olango drew an object and extended it in two hands towards police in a shooting stance before being shot. The object was an e-cigarette.
September 28	Christopher Sowell	32	Philadelphia, Pennsylvania	Police attempted to arrest Sowell, who was suspected in a series of stabbings and physical attacks. Officers ordered Sowell to take his hands out of his pockets. When he moved his hands abruptly, police shot him, with nine officers firing a total of 109 times.

== 2017 ==
Total for 2017: 25

Date	Name	Age	City	Description
January 4	Muhammad Muhaymin Jr.	43	Phoenix, Arizona	Police were called after Muhaymin attempted to bring his dog into a public bathroom. Police restrained Muhaymin after he was found to have a warrant, and Muhaymin died. An autopsy ruled Muhaymin's death a homicide.
January 6	Sean Moore	42	San Francisco, California	Police responded to reports of Moore violating a restraining order. Authorities say an officer struck Moore with a baton, leading Moore to strike back. Officer Kenneth Cha then shot Moore. Moore died in 2020 and an autopsy found his death was partially caused by the gunshot wound. Cha was charged with voluntary manslaughter and assault with a semi-automatic firearm.
January 9	JR Williams	38	Phoenix, Arizona	Following a pursuit Williams kept his hands concealed and threatened to shoot officers. When Williams turned with his hand from his waistband, police shot him. Williams was unarmed.
January 26	Deaundre Phillips	24	Atlanta, Georgia	Police responded to reports of a suspicious man in a vehicle. Officer Yasin Abdulahad shot Phillips when the vehicle started to drive off. Abdulahad claimed he was halfway in the car and was being dragged, but surveillance video showed he had fully entered the vehicle when it started moving.
February 7	Wardel Davis	20	Buffalo, New York	Officers Todd C. McAlister and Nicholas J. Parisi stopped Davis after he was seen exiting a known drug house. A physical encounter occurred, and Davis fell unconscious and died. An autopsy ruled his death a homicide.
February 8	Chad Robertson	25	Chicago, Illinois	Amtrak Police Officer LaRoyce Tankson patted down Robertson near Union Station. Robertson fled and reached into his pocket, causing Tankson to shoot. Robertson did not have any weapons, and there was marijuana in his pocket. Tankson was charged with murder but was acquitted.
February 9	Quanice Hayes	17	Portland, Oregon	Officer Andrew Hearst shot Hayes from 10 feet away with an AR-15. Hayes was on his knees with hands in the air. A jury declined to indict Hearst.
February 13	Raynard Burton	19	Detroit, Michigan	Following a pursuit of a stolen car Officer Jerold Blanding struggled with Burton, ending when Blanding shot Burton in the chest. Prior to Burton's death Blanding had been involved in four shootings, two off-duty.
March 13	Luke Stewart	23	Euclid, Ohio	While responding to a suspicious vehicle report, Officer Matthew Rhodes entered Stewart's vehicle when he began to drive away. After shocking and hitting Stewart with a stun gun, Rhodes shot him. A grand jury declined to indict Rhodes.
March 19	Alteria Woods	21	Gifford, Florida	Woods was lying on a bed in her boyfriend's home when police conducted a raid. A shootout occurred, and Woods was struck by police gunfire.
April 12	Kenneth Johnson	25	Reading, Pennsylvania	Police responding to a domestic dispute call encountered a woman who told them her boyfriend assaulted her. When police encountered Johnson, he swung at them when police tried to handcuff him, and an officer tased him. Johnson became unresponsive and died, and his death was later ruled a homicide.
April 29	Jordan Edwards	15	Balch Springs, Texas	Jordan Edwards, a 15-year-old boy, was fatally shot by police officer Roy Oliver. He was struck in the back of the head while riding in the front passenger seat of a car driving away from police. Police originally claimed the vehicle was backing toward them in an aggressive manner, but video later revealed that the car was driving away at the time Edwards was shot. Oliver was found guilty of murdering Edwards at trial in August 2018 and was sentenced to 15 years in prison.
May 7	Landon Nobles	24	Austin, Texas	Sergeant Richard Egal and Corporal Maxwell Johnson shot and killed Nobles as a crowd dispersed in front of a bar. Police stated that Nobles fired at officers but several witnesses said Nobles was unarmed.
May 14	Tashii Farmer	40	Las Vegas, Nevada	Tashii Farmer (also known as Tashii Brown) was reported to be acting erratically at The Venetian hotel-casino and was chased by officers. Police tased Farmer when he tried to enter a citizen's truck. Officer Kenneth Lopera then placed Farmer in a rear-naked choke, leading to his death. An autopsy ruled Farmer's death a homicide. Lopera was charged with manslaughter but his charges were dropped.
May 21	Jimmie Sanders	33	Appleton, Wisconsin	Sanders was at a bar when police responded to reports of a man firing a gun. A lieutenant shot at the armed man, but struck Sanders instead, killing him.
May 25	Adam Trammell	22	West Milwaukee, Wisconsin	A woman called police to report Trammell, who had schizophrenia, was naked and acting strangely. Trammell returned to his home, where he entered a shower and began drinking water from a jug. Police entered the bathroom and tased him 15 times. By the time an ambulance arrived, Trammell had no pulse and stopped breathing. The medical examiner's report said that the taser was a significant factor in Trammell's death.
June 8	David Jones	30	Philadelphia, Pennsylvania	Officer Ryan Pownall pulled over Jones, on a dirt bike, in the Juniata neighborhood. Pownall frisked Jones and felt a firearm, leading to a struggle. Pownall attempted to shoot Jones but his gun jammed. Jones then threw his gun down and ran away. Pownall shot him three times in the back. Pownall was later charged with homicide.
June 29	Aaron Bailey	45	Indianapolis, Indiana	Following a chase two officers shot and killed Bailey. The officers stated they believed Bailey was reaching for a weapon, but no weapon was found.
July 7	Eurie Martin	58	Deepstep, Georgia	Martin was reported after a man noticed him trying to fill an empty soda can with water from a spigot. Three deputies tased Martin, who fell unconscious and died. A medical examiner determined his death was a homicide. The officers were charged but a mistrial was declared after the jury deadlocked.
August 27	Damon Grimes	15	Detroit, Michigan	Officer Mark Bessner tased Grimes as he drove by a police car on an ATV, causing him to crash into a truck. Bessner stated he believed Grimes was reaching for a gun, but no weapon was found on him.
August 28	Anthony Antonio Ford	27	Miami, Florida	Following a traffic stop Officer Eduardo Pares shot and killed Ford in an alley. The state attorney for Miami-Dade County declined to file charges against the officer.
October 20	Armando Frank	42	Marksville, Louisiana	Police attempted to arrest Frank for a warrant, finding him sitting on a tractor. After refusing to get off the tractor without seeing the warrant, officers tried to get him down, with police firing a shock device three times and putting Frank in several choke holds. Frank died, and a forensic pathologist determined his death was a homicide.
November 18	Lawrence Hawkins	56	Prichard, Alabama	Officer Jonathan Murphy shot and killed Hawkins in front of his home, including twice in the back. In 2020 Murphy was arrested for murder relating to a separate off-duty killing.
December 1	Keita O'Neil	42	San Francisco, California	Rookie Officer Chris Samayoa shot O'Neil, suspected of a carjacking, during a chase. After O'Neil exited the stolen van, he fled to a housing complex and was shot in the back of the head by Samayoa, on his fourth day on the job. Samayoa was charged with manslaughter in 2020.
December 27	Dennis Plowden	25	Philadelphia, Pennsylvania	Following a chase Officer Eric Ruch shot Plowden as he had his left hand visibly raised in the air. Ruch was charged with first-degree murder, third-degree murder, voluntary manslaughter and possession of an instrument of crime. Ruch was convicted of manslaughter in 2022.

== 2018 ==
Total for 2018: 41

Date	Name	Age	City	Description
January 23	Corey Mobley	38	Bradenton, Florida	An officer responded to a domestic incident and shot Mobley. Mobley claimed he had a gun, but he was unarmed.
January 27	Crystalline Barnes	21	Jackson, Mississippi	After a pursuit for a traffic violation, police fired at Barnes, stating she hit a patrol car while driving in reverse. According to court documents, one of the officers, Rakasha Adams, fired when Barnes attempted to drive away from the patrol car and the curb. The other officer, Albert Taylor, fired after the car made a U-turn, although Taylor had earlier stated he was the first to fire. Adams then fired again. In total, 17 bullets were fired at the vehicle, from the sides and back.
February 13	Ronnell Foster	33	Vallejo, California	Officer Ryan McMahon shot and killed Foster after a struggle, which started after McMahon pulled Foster over for riding a bicycle without proper lights. After McMahon struck Foster several times with his flashlight, Foster took it and McMahon shot him. McMahon was later one of the officers involved in the shooting of Willie McCoy in 2019.
February 17	Trey Pringle	23	Seabrook, South Carolina	Pringle's family called 911 after he began exhibiting strange behavior while watching TV. Deputies struggled with Pringle and tased him twice. He went into cardiac arrest and died three days later; his death was ruled a homicide. No charges were filed against the deputies involved.
February 21	Darion Baker	22	Stratford, Texas	Police followed Baker to a gas station for driving suspiciously. When officers flashed their lights, drew their guns, and ran towards the car, Baker and his passenger entered their car, which was stolen, and fled. An officer shot Baker in the back.
March 2	Christopher Eisinger	35	Anaheim, California	Police responded to reports of a man attempting to open a house gate and encountered Eisinger. Police restrained Eisinger and an officer put their knee on his sternum. After several minutes, officers noticed Eisinger was unconscious. A jury determined police used excessive force and were largely responsible for Eisinger's death.
March 12	Terrall Magee	54	Santa Ana, California	Police responded to a report of a burglary at a business and encountered Magee, who fled. Officers pursued Magee and restrained him, and Magee fell unconscious. He was pronounced dead at a hospital, and his death was later ruled a homicide.
March 18	Stephon Clark	22	Sacramento, California	Two Sacramento Police Department officers, who were investigating reports of a hooded individual breaking car windows, chased Stephon Clark from the front yard to the back yard of his grandmother's house and stopped before walking towards the officers. One or both officers yelled "show me your hands!" and "gun!" before the officers collectively fired 20 rounds. At least 7 of the 20 shots struck Clark, killing him. The county coroner found that three shots had struck Clark in the back, while an independent autopsy found Clark was struck six times in the back, and once in the front after he was already on the ground. The encounter was filmed by police body camera and by a Sacramento County Sheriff's Department helicopter. Police stated they fired because they believed Clark pointed a gun at them. No gun was found at the scene, and police later admitted that the officers had mistaken Clark's cell phone for a gun. In 2019, the Sacramento County district attorney declined to press charges against the police officers, announcing an investigation had found the use of deadly force to be justified.
March 22	Danny Ray Thomas	34	Houston, Texas	Deputy Cameron Brewer approached two men having an argument at an intersection. Brewer killed Thomas after he walked towards Brewer and ignored his commands to stop. Brewer was later fired, and a spokesperson said he should have used his taser first.
March 25	J'Allen Jones	31	Newtown, Connecticut	Correctional officers at Garner Correctional Institution kneed and beat Jones after he refused to cooperate with a strip search. Officers put a spit hood over Jones' head and pepper sprayed him. He fell unconscious and died; his death was ruled a homicide.
April 4	Saheed Vassell	34	New York City, New York	Police responded to reports of a man with a silver gun in Crown Heights, Brooklyn and shot Vassell when he took a shooting stance. Vassell was holding a metal pipe with a knob on it.
April 5	Diante Yarber	26	Barstow, California	An officer shot Yarber in a Walmart parking lot while investigating a stolen vehicle after he allegedly rammed a police vehicle. The officer had previously been fired from the department after pleading guilty to a hate crime battery, but an arbiter found his termination wrongful and had him reinstated.
April 8	Juan Markee Jones	25	Danville, Virginia	Two officers responding to a report of a domestic assault shot and killed Jones after he quickly turned around towards them. Prosecutors declined to file charges against the officers involved.
April 20	James Bauduy	48	Orlando, Florida	Bauduy, suspected of killing his ex-girlfriend's mother, was shot by police during his arrest. An investigation by the Florida Department of Law Enforcement found there was no gun on or near Bauduy, although there was a magazine with bullets near him.
April 26	Jeffrey Melvin	27	Colorado Springs, Colorado	Melvin was tased multiple times by police responding to a disturbance. Melvin was hospitalized and died about a week later. His death was ruled a homicide.
May 14	Keeven Robinson	22	Jefferson Parish, Louisiana	Following a chase police restrained and handcuffed Robinson. After he was handcuffed officers noticed Robinson was not breathing and brought him to a hospital, where he died. A coroner ruled his death a homicide due to asphyxiation.
May 14	Marcus-David Peters	24	Richmond, Virginia	During a mental health crisis Peters had a car accident and took off his clothes. He approached Officer Michael Nyantakyi, who tased Peters multiple times before shooting him.
May 26	Earl McNeil	40	National City, California	McNeil was restrained with a WRAP device and had two mesh socks put over his head after he turned himself in for a warrant. A nurse referred McNeil for a full medical evaluation but he lost his pulse by the time the ambulance arrived at the hospital. The medical examiner ruled his death a homicide.
June 6	Maurice Granton Jr.	24	Chicago, Illinois	An officer shot Granton as he climbed a fence. Police say they recovered a weapon, but an attorney stated that it was found 20 to 25 feet from where he was shot. An autopsy showed Granton was shot in the back.
June 7	Terrance Ivor Watts	26	Frederick, Maryland	Police responded to reports of a man causing a disturbance. Police restrained Watts while trying to take him into custody, and he fell unconscious and died. His death was initially ruled an accident, but a 2025 audit found it should have been ruled a homicide.
June 11	Robert Lawrence White	41	Silver Spring, Maryland	An officer shot White after he reached into his pocket. The officer stated he believed White was armed.
June 19	Antwon Rose Jr.	17	East Pittsburgh, Pennsylvania	After Officer Michael Rosfeld pulled over a vehicle suspected of being used in an earlier drive-by shooting, Rose and another occupant fled. Rosfeld fired, hitting Rose in the back. Although there were weapons and the car and gunshot residue was found on Rose's hands, he was unarmed at the time of the shooting.
June 20	Anthony Marcel Green	33	Kingsland, Georgia	After a traffic stop Officer Zechariah Presley chased Green and shot him as he fled. Presley was acquitted of manslaughter charges but found guilty of violating his oath of office. He was sentenced to a year in prison and four years probation.
June 24	Dujuan Armstrong	23	Dublin, California	Armstrong died after deputies at the Santa Rita Jail restrained him with a full-body restraining jacket and a spit mask. The sheriff initially said Armstrong died of a drug overdose, but an autopsy found his death was a homicide due to the restraint.
July 8	Joseph Pettaway	51	Montgomery, Alabama	Police responded to reports of a possible burglary and encountered Pettaway at the house, where family said he sometimes slept with permission. Police unleashed a canine unit on Pettaway, who was bitten in the thigh and femoral artery. The dog's handler testified he had to choke the dog to near-unconsciousness to get it to let go. Pettaway was sent to the hospital, where he died from his injuries.
July 14	Rashaun Washington	37	Vineland, New Jersey	An officer shot Washington with a rifle as he held an object wrapped in a black shirt. Police said Washington was holding garden shears, while some witnesses said he was holding a water bottle.
July 27	Cynthia Ann Fields	60	Savannah, Georgia	Police attempted to arrest Fields' grandson for a suspected armed robbery. After officers arrived a shootout occurred between her grandson and police, and Fields was struck by police gunfire. The grandson was charged with murder, among several other charges.
September 1	O'Shae Terry	24	Arlington, Texas	During a traffic stop Officer Bau Tran grabbed the passenger side window of Terry's vehicle and shot him as the vehicle began to move. Tran was indicted on a criminally negligent homicide charge.
September 5	James Leatherwood	23	Hollywood, Florida	A SWAT officer shot Leatherwood, suspected of a murder in Miami, after he reached for his waistband. No firearm was found in the apartment.
September 6	Botham Jean	26	Dallas, Texas	Off-duty Dallas Police Department officer Amber Guyger entered Botham Jean's apartment and fatally shot him. Guyger said she entered the apartment believing it was her own and that she shot Jean believing he was a burglar. On October 1, 2019, Guyger was found guilty of murder. The next day, she received a sentence of ten years in prison.
September 8	Marcus Smith	38	Greensboro, North Carolina	Police restrained Smith after reports of a man running through traffic in Downtown Greensboro. Smith fell unconscious and died at the scene, and his death was ruled a homicide.
September 15	Anton Black	19	Greensboro, Maryland	Police restrained Black outside his family's home, where he was handcuffed and shackled before he stopped breathing. The state medical examiner's office concluded Black's death was accidental, but a cardiologist at Johns Hopkins University concluded he died by asphyxiation.
October 3	Chinedu Okobi	36	Millbrae, California	San Mateo County Sheriff's Deputy Joshua Wang stopped Okobi after he was suspected of jaywalking. Wang and other deputies used tasers, batons, and pepper spray on Okobi, who fell unconscious and died. His death was ruled a homicide.
October 17	Charles Roundtree Jr.	18	San Antonio, Texas	Officer Steve Casanova, responding to reports of an assault, shot a man who he believed had a gun, but the man's DNA was not found on the weapon. The bullet unintentionally struck Roundtree, killing him.
October 28	Marshall Miles	36	Sacramento, California	Police arrested Miles after he was reported for jumping on cars. When he was transported to jail he struggled with officers and fell unconscious, dying four days later. An autopsy determined his death was caused by a combination of "complications of cardiopulmonary arrest during restraint and mixed drug intoxication".
October 29	Albert Dorsey	30	Los Angeles, California	Officer Edward Agdeppa and his partner responded to a 24-hour gym in Hollywood after reports of a disturbance and encounter Dorsey, naked, drying himself off in a locker room. After he ignored commands, the officers attempted to handcuff him. According to Agdeppa, the officers tased Dorsey, who fought with officers and straddled over Agdeppa's partner before punching her in the face. Agdeppa then said that he told Dorsey to stop, then shot him. However, audio of the shooting does not show Agdeppa telling Dorsey to stop before the officer shot him, and U.S. District Judge Christina Snyder ruled that there was no evidence of injuries inflicted by Dorsey onto Agdeppa's partner.
November 1	Tony Bernard Smith Jr.	24	Jacksonville, Florida	Smith, a suspect in a carjacking, was shot by officer Rodney Deconte on a flight of stairs. No gun was found on Smith during the shooting, but a gun was found between the stolen truck and Smith.
November 29	Robert Loggins	26	Grenada, Mississippi	Police responded to reports that Loggins was in a woman's backyard. Police restrained and tased Loggins before taking him to the lobby of the jail, where he was left in the prone position. He fell unconscious and died. The state medical examiner ruled his death an accident, but a forensic pathologist concluded his death was a homicide. In 2005 Loggins' mother Debbie Loggins similarly died after she was restrained by police. Her death had been ruled an accident due to advanced heatstroke, despite the sun not having risen, the temperature being in the 70s, and police transporting her in an air-conditioned car.
December 9	Christopher De'Andre Mitchell	22	Torrance, California	Police responded to a stolen vehicle report and encountered Mitchell in a Honda Civic in a supermarket parking lot. After refusing orders to exit the car, police shot Mitchell when he appeared to move his hands towards an air rifle in his lap, though a review said there was no evidence he was reaching for a gun. While the shooting was originally ruled justified, the two officers were charged with voluntary manslaughter in 2023, with district attorney George Gascón questioning whether the officers actually saw the air rifle when they fired.
December 10	Gregory Edwards	38	Cocoa, Florida	Edwards, a combat veteran, who had been diagnosed with PTSD, was arrested in a Walmart parking lot for allegedly assaulting a charity worker. At the police station, Edwards was being escorted when he became involved in a brawl with officers. He was eventually restrained by more than a dozen officers who used pepper spray and stun guns. He was then restrained him in a chair for 16 minutes with a spit hood on. Edwards became unresponsive and was taken to a hospital where he was pronounced dead. In the official autopsy report, the cause of death was listed as "excited delirium."
December 17	David Baker	32	Aurora, Colorado	Police responded to a domestic call about a fight. At least seven officers restrained Baker, who fell unconscious and was declared dead less than an hour later.

== 2019 ==
Total for 2019: 25

Date	Name	Age	City	Description
January 1	Brandon Webster	28	Shallotte, North Carolina	Webster and his girlfriend drove to a convenience store to pick up snacks for a football game watch party. A state trooper parked outside the store pulled Webster over for allegedly fishtailing his wheels. During the stop, the trooper approached the driver's side door and said he was going to break the window. Webster attempted to drive away, and the trooper shot him. The trooper said Webster had attempted to strike him with the truck, but an analysis found the shots were fired from the side, outside of the truck's path of movement.
January 5	Jameek Lowery	27	Paterson, New Jersey	Lowery called 911 to say he had swallowed too many ecstasy pills, requesting an ambulance. At the hospital he became erratic and left, later moving to Paterson Police headquarters, where he filmed himself saying people were trying to kill him. When firefighters arrived, police used "physical force and compliance holds" to secure Lowery in an ambulance. By the time Lowery arrived at the hospital, he was unconscious, and he died two days later. An official autopsy said Lowery's death was accidental, but a second examination from pathologist Michael Baden determined his death was caused by police beating him as he was restrained.
January 13	George Robinson	62	Jackson, Mississippi	Officers pulled Robinson from a car, threw him against the pavement, and struck and kicked him. Robinson died two days later and his death was ruled a homicide. Officers Desmond Barney, Lincoln Lampley, and Anthony Fox were indicted on second-degree murder, but Barney and Lampley's charges were later dropped.
January 15	D'Ettrick Griffin	18	Atlanta, Georgia	Griffin stole a vehicle at a gas station, not knowing it was an unmarked vehicle driven by off-duty Officer Oliver Simmonds. When Griffin tried to drive away Simmons shot him, with the vehicle allegedly driving over Simmonds' foot. Simmonds was indicted for murder, assault, and two counts of violating his oath in 2022.
January 22	Jimmy Atchison	21	Atlanta, Georgia	A federal task force shot Atchison during an investigation into an armed robbery. Atchison was hiding in a closet and was given conflicting commands to come out with his hands up and to not move. Atchison was leaving the closet when Officer Sung Kim shot him. In 2022 Kim was charged with murder, involuntary manslaughter, and violation of oath by a public officer.
February 6	Eleanor Northington	43	Indianapolis, Indiana	Police responding to a mental health crisis restrained Northington at a church. Northington fell unconscious and died due to a lack of oxygen to the brain.
February 14	Mario Clark	31	Jackson, Mississippi	Clark's mother called police after Clark, who had schizophrenia, started having a psychotic episode. Police handcuffed Clark and hit him on his legs and head. Clark was put on life support and died days later. His death was ruled a homicide.
February 16	Michael Elam Jr.	17	Chicago, Illinois	Following a vehicle pursuit for a traffic offence, the car crashed and three teenagers, including Elam, fled on foot. Officer Adolfo Bolanos shot Elam three times, twice in the back and once in the back of the head. A gun was recovered from the scene, but bodycamera video showed it was on the other side of the car near where Elam was shot, and attorneys stated he was unarmed. The Civilian Office of Police Accountability recommended Bolanos be fired for shooting Elam, not activating his body camera, not immediately telling dispatchers about the shooting, and not immediately requesting medical attention.
February 18	Pierre Woods	31	Pelahatchie, Mississippi	Police responded after reports of a man firing a gun on his property. After negotiations and a stand-off deputies launched tear gas into the home. Woods exited the front door and threw a pistol onto the ground. The deputies then began shooting, killing Woods. Several of the officers involved later pleaded guilty to torturing two men at a home in 2023.
March 24	Kevin Bruce Mason	57	Baltimore, Maryland	Police responded to an assault call at a home and entered a standoff with Mason. Following the standoff, during which Mason claimed he had a gun, police shot Mason as he stepped outside. A search of the home found no firearms. Mason had been involved in another standoff with police when he was 17.
March 28	Javier Ambler	40	Austin, Texas	Deputies James Johnson and Zachary Camden tased Ambler multiple times during a traffic stop, leading to his death. Ambler's death was ruled a homicide, and in 2021, Johnson and Camden were indicted on manslaughter charges. In addition, Williamson County Sheriff Robert Chody was indicted on a felony evidence tampering charge. Ambler's death was recorded by a Live PD crew, but A&E stated that the footage had been deleted.
April 13	Julius Graves	43	St. Louis, Missouri	Police responded to reports of a man attacking a bus stop and encountered Graves, who had a history of mental health issues. Officers chased and attempted to tase him. Police handcuffed and restrained Graves, and while held down EMTs injected him with an antipsychotic and a sedative. He fell unconscious and was declared brain-dead, and was taken off of life support days later.
April 29	Isaiah Lewis	17	Edmond, Oklahoma	Police responded to reports of a person running naked in a neighborhood. After officers found Lewis, he broke into a home and had an altercation with officers. An officer shot Lewis.
May 10	Ronald Greene	49	Union Parish, Louisiana	Police chased Greene after a traffic violation. After a crash, police beat and dragged Greene, also putting him in a headlock. He became unresponsive and was put in an ambulance, but he died on arrival to the hospital. Initial reports stated Greene's death was caused by the car accident, but a later medical examiner stated his death was a homicide.
May 15	D'Juantez Anthony Mitchell	30	Jeffersontown, Kentucky	Police investigated Mitchell in connection with a series of robberies. As officers surrounded Mitchell in his vehicle, he accelerated, hitting a Jeffersontown Police car. An officer with the Louisville Metro Police Department then shot him.
May 26	Terrence Bridges Jr.	30	Kansas City, Missouri	Police responded to reports of a carjacking and encountered Bridges. After a struggle Bridges was shot by Officer Dylan Pifer, who told investigators he feared Bridges was reaching for a gun in his sweatshirt.
June 2	Miles Hall	23	Walnut Creek, California	Shot by police during a mental health crisis. The family called 911 to help Miles who was having a mental health emergency. Miles' mother had a longstanding relationship with the local police, who knew about Miles' schizoaffective disorder and had helped the family hospitalize him in the past. However the officers who arrived that day fatally shot Miles within minutes of their arrival.
June 16	Ryan Twyman	24	Willowbrook, California	Deputy Andrew Lyons and another deputy responded to an apartment complex and shot Twyman after he put his vehicle into reverse. Lyons then retrieved his semiautomatic rifle and fired again, after the vehicle stopped moving. Lyons was charged with one felony count of voluntary manslaughter and two felony counts of assault with a semiautomatic firearm.
July 5	Tymar Crawford	28	Pensacola, Florida	Police pulled Crawford over for marijuana. After fleeing from officers, Crawford and an officer scuffled, at which point another officer shot him. The officer who shot Crawford was later fired for violating department policy.
July 25	Josef Richardson	38	Port Allen, Louisiana	Deputy Vance Mantranga shot Richardson in the back of the neck during a drug sting after he reached towards his waistband.
August 24	Elijah McClain	23	Aurora, Colorado	McClain, a massage therapist, died after officers Nathan Woodyard, Jason Rosenblatt, and Randy Roedema restrained him, after which paramedics Jeremy Cooper and Peter Cichuniec used ketamine to sedate him. McClain fell unconscious, was declared brain dead, and died on August 30. Originally listed as undetermined and unknown, McClain's autopsy report was later amended to state his death was caused by "acute Ketamine administration during violent subdual and restraint by law enforcement and emergency response personnel," although the manner of death was still undetermined. The officers and paramedics were charged with manslaughter and lesser charges.
September 5	Byron Williams	50	Las Vegas, Nevada	Williams died after police restrained him after he was stopped for riding his bicycle without safety lights. The county coroner's office ruled his death a homicide.
October 14	Christopher Whitfield	31	Ethel, Louisiana	Deputy Glenn Sims Sr. chased Whitfield after he allegedly stole raw chicken from a convenience store. Sims fired a warning shot into the ground and grabbed the back of Whitfield's hoodie, leading to a scuffle. Police say during the scuffle, Whitfield hit Sims' gun, causing it to fire and hit Whitfield in the back.
December 2	Michael Lorenzo Dean	28	Temple, Texas	Officer Carmen DeCruz shot and killed Dean after a traffic stop. An affidavit says DeCruz pointed his gun at Dean with his right hand and tried to pull Dean's car keys with his left, leading him to shoot Dean. DeCruz resigned and was charged with second-degree-manslaughter. He was acquitted in February 2023.
December 3	Cameron Lamb	26	Kansas City, Missouri	Following a traffic accident Officer Erik J. DeValkenaere shot and killed Lamb as he backed his pick-up truck into his driveway. DeValkenaere said he believed Lamb was pointing a gun at his partner, but Lamb was unarmed. DeValkenaere was sentenced to six years in prison for involuntary manslaughter and armed criminal actions. After serving little more than a year the remainder of DeValkenaere's sentence was commuted on December 20, 2024, by outgoing Missouri governor, Mike Parson.

== 2020 ==
Total for 2020: 32

Date	Name	Age	City	Description
January 5	Kwame Jones	17	Jacksonville, Florida	An officer attempted to pull over a stolen vehicle, causing a chase. After the vehicle crash a backseat passenger pointed a gun at the officer. The officer shot the backseat passenger and Jones, in the front passenger seat. The backseat passenger survived.
January 27	William Howard Green	43	Oxon Hill, Maryland	Officer Michael Owen Jr. handcuffed Green after a car accident and put him in the passenger seat of his vehicle, as the backseat did not have a divider. At some point, Owen got into the front seat and shot Green. Investigators were originally told that the officers believed Green was under the influence of PCP and there was a struggle, but neither were true. Owen was charged with second-degree murder and manslaughter the day after.
January 28	Jaquyn Oneill Light	20	Graham, North Carolina	Light ran outside his back door after police arrived and collided with Officer Marcus Pollock. The district attorney stated Pollock could have either fired accidentally or in self-defense, but the former was most likely what happened. Pollock was not charged.
February 1	Leonard Parker Jr.	53	Gulfport, Mississippi	During a birthday party Parker attempted to diffuse an argument between a man and his girlfriend, causing a brief fight between the two men. After a guest at the party called police, Parker offered to drive the other man back to his hotel. As Parker backed out of the driveway, an officer responding to the earlier call opened fire, killing him. According to witnesses the truck was moving around three to five miles when the officer fired.
February 3	Carl Grant	68	Birmingham, Alabama	While driving to the grocery store, Grant, a Vietnam War veteran with dementia, became disoriented and drove from Georgia to Birmingham, where he attempted to enter a home he believed was his. Several officers, including Vincent Larry, responded to a burglary call, where they shoved Grant down the porch steps and handcuffed him. They brought Grant to the University of Alabama at Birmingham Hospital. When Grant attempted to leave his hospital room, believing he needed to charge a phone he had actually left at home, Larry threw Grant to the ground. Grant was paralyzed and died six months later, and his death was attributed to the bodyslam. Larry was suspended for fifteen days and was ordered to undergo retraining.
February 25	Reginald Payne	48	Sacramento, California	Payne's mother called 911 to report Payne, who had diabetes, was having a medical emergency and needed glucose. After firefighters arrived, they called police to restrain Payne so they could treat him. Officers held him face-down in the prone position, causing him to suffer cardiac arrest. In 2022 the fire captain on scene was fired for failing to intervene.
March 3	Manuel Ellis	33	Tacoma, Washington	Manuel Ellis died during an arrest by police officers. Police claimed Ellis initiated a fight, while state prosecutors quoted civilian witnesses stating that police initiated physical force while Ellis did not fight back. Video showed officers punching Ellis, choking him, using a taser, and kneeling on him. Ellis was recorded saying he "can't breathe". Ellis was hogtied, face-down, with an officer on him, for at least six minutes, and a spit hood was placed on his head, stated prosecutors. Ellis died at the scene while receiving medical aid. Ellis's death was ruled as a homicide. Two officers were charged with murder; another officer was charged with manslaughter. On December 21, 2023, a jury found all three officers not guilty on all charges.
March 8	Barry Gedeus	27	Fort Lauderdale, Florida	Police approached Gedeus in connection with an earlier sexual battery. Police chased Gedeus and one shot him. Gedeus was unarmed when he was shot.
March 12	Donnie Sanders	47	Kansas City, Missouri	An officer shot and killed Sanders after he ran from a traffic stop and raised his arms "as though he had a weapon". Sanders was unarmed.
March 13	Breonna Taylor	26	Louisville, Kentucky	Taylor, a 26-year-old emergency medical technician, was fatally shot by Louisville Metro Police Department (LMPD) officers Jonathan Mattingly, Brett Hankison, and Myles Cosgrove on March 13, 2020. According to a wrongful death lawsuit filed against the police by the Taylor family's attorney, the officers, who were dressed in plain clothes, breached Taylor's front door with a battering ram, and entered without knocking or announcing a search warrant, opened fire "with a total disregard for the value of human life".
March 23	Daniel Prude	41	Rochester, New York	Responding to a mental health call, officers physically restrained Prude and put a spit hood on him. Prude stopped breathing and was taken off life support a week later. An autopsy ruled his death a homicide.
March 30	Sterling Lester Chest Jr.	45	Springfield, Massachusetts	Police were called to report concerns about Chest's mental state. After an emergency psychiatric hospitalization was approved, police spoke to Chest, who pushed them. Officers used a stun gun on him and handcuffed him before taking him to the hospital. He died a few days later on April 3, and an autopsy ruled he died from cardiac tamponade following a physical altercation with police including an electric shock. His manner of death was undetermined.
April 23	Fred Brown	34	North Las Vegas, Nevada	Police accompanying a woman to her apartment encountered Brown, who had a warrant for his arrest. When police attempted to arrest him, Brown fought with officers, at one point putting an officer in a chokehold. The officer broke free, then shot Brown.
April 24	Michael Ramos	42	Austin, Texas	A woman called police to report Ramos and other people using drugs in a car with a gun, though the caller later stated she never saw a gun and had reported what other bystanders had told her. When Officer Christopher Taylor arrived, Ramos exited the car with his hands up and shirt raised. He then reentered the car and began to drive away. Taylor shot Ramos with a beanbag, then a rifle. He was charged with murder but a mistrial was declared. Taylor is also facing murder charges for a separate shooting.
April 29	Denzel Marshal Taylor	Unknown	Sikeston, Missouri	Officers responded to a shooting involving Milton Taylor, who identified his son as the one who shot him. Police found Taylor, who had his hands in his pockets. Taylor refused to remove his hands from his pockets and told the officers to kill him. Police then shot Taylor, who had a piece of wood in his pocket.
May 1	Shaun Fuhr	24	Seattle, Washington	A woman called police to report Fuhr had shot at her and taken their daughter at gunpoint. As officers chased Fuhr in the Columbia City neighborhood, an officer shot him in the head as he held his daughter. While Fuhr had wielded a gun prior, he had dropped it by the time he was shot.
May 23	Maurice Gordon	28	Bass River, New Jersey	Gordon was pulled over for speeding by State Trooper Randall Wetzel. During the stop Gordon's car became disabled, so Wetzel invited him to sit in the back seat of his police vehicle. After questioning why he kept getting up and unbuckling his seat belt, Wetzel went to get him a face mask. Gordon then exited the vehicle and ran. Wetzel pulled Gordon away from the vehicle after he approached the driver's seat, and after a struggle Wetzel fired six times.
May 25	George Floyd	46	Minneapolis, Minnesota	Floyd was murdered by a police officer, Derek Chauvin, who knelt on Floyd's neck for almost ten minutes while Floyd was handcuffed and lying face-down on the street. Two other officers further restrained Floyd, and a fourth officer prevented onlookers from intervening. During the final three minutes, Floyd was motionless and had no pulse. Officers made no attempt to revive him, and Chauvin's knee remained on his neck even as emergency medical technicians attempted to treat him. Two autopsies found Floyd's death to be a homicide. After a seven-week trial, on April 21, 2021, a Minnesota state jury convicted Chauvin of murdering Floyd.
June 10	Michael L. Thomas	62	Lancaster, California	Deputies responded to Thomas's home after a domestic violence report. Thomas refused to let the deputies into his home and police shot him after a confrontation. The Los Angeles County Sheriff's Department said Thomas reached to grab a deputy's weapon, while his fiancée disputed this.
July 6	William Wade Burgess III	27	St. Louis, Missouri	Deputy James Buchanan was driving to work when he witnessed Burgess attempting to drive over a boy and his grandfather, who he had attacked earlier. Buchanan chased Burgess and shot him in an alley. Although Buchanan had wielded a weapon during the earlier attack, he was unarmed when Buchanan shot him. Buchanan was indicted on second-degree murder and armed criminal action charges in 2021.
August 7	Julian Edward Roosevelt Lewis	60	Screven County, Georgia	Officer Jacob Gordon Thompson shot Lewis after performing a PIT maneuver. Thompson was charged with felony murder and aggravated assault but the charges were later dropped.
September 23	Kurt Reinhold	42	San Clemente, California	After stopping Reinhold for jaywalking, a struggle broke out and Deputy Eduardo Duran shot Reinhold. The deputy claims Reinhold tried to take his weapon.
October 3	Mickel Lewis	39	Mojave, California	Lewis was pulled over for a vehicle infraction, during which he exited his vehicle. The sheriff's office said Deputy Jason Ayala shot Lewis when he reached back into the car and ran towards the officer with his hand in his waistband. No gun was found on Lewis, who was shot five times, including twice in the back. A jury awarded his family $30.5 million.
October 3	Jonathan Price	31	Wolfe City, Texas	Price intervened in a disturbance at a gas station. When Officer Shaun Lucas arrived, he tased then shot Price. Lucas was charged with murder two days later. He was acquitted in September 2022.
October 12	Anthony Jones	24	Bethel Springs, Tennessee	Following a chase Jones crashed his car and "portrayed, with actions and statements, to have a firearm," according to the Tennessee Bureau of Investigation, although no firearm was recovered. An officer from Henderson shot Jones.
October 15	Dana Young	47	Los Angeles, California	Police attempted to arrest Young for kidnapping a woman at gunpoint. Following a vehicle chase, Young exited his vehicle and approached deputies holding a black object. A deputy shot him four times after Young raised the object, which was found to be a black COVID-19 mask.
October 20	Marcellis Stinnette	19	Waukegan, Illinois	Stinnette was a passenger in a vehicle driven by his girlfriend, Tafara Williams, parked outside Williams's mother's apartment. When an officer approached the car after a report of a suspicious vehicle, it fled. A short time later, Officer Dante Salinas pulled the car over. The vehicle crashed and Williams drove in reverse. Salinas, who was not in the path of the vehicle, opened fire, killing Stinnette and wounding Williams. In September 2022 Salinas was charged with second-degree murder and involuntary manslaughter, while Williams was charged with aggravated fleeing.
November 8	Frederick Cox	18	High Point, North Carolina	Cox was attending a funeral at a church for a murder victim when a drive-by shooting occurred. Under disputed circumstances, Cox was shot and killed by Deputy Michael Shane Hill who had been investigating the murder and was at the funeral at the request of murder victim's family. According to a lawsuit from Cox's family, during the drive-by shooting, Cox ran to the church and was holding the door open for a mother and son when Hill shot him in the back. The North Carolina State Bureau of Investigation said that Hill had reported seeing Cox with a handgun when he shot him and that other witnesses had observed a handgun close to Cox after the shooting. Cox's family disputed this, claiming he was unarmed. An investigation determined that Cox was unarmed at the time of the shooting.
November 13	Angelo Crooms	16	Cocoa, Florida	Police were investigating a stolen car when they encountered Pierce and Crooms, who were borrowing the vehicle. Officer Santiago-Miranda shot and killed Pierce and Crooms when the vehicle drove forwards in the direction of the officer.
November 13	Sincere Pierce	18	Cocoa, Florida	Police were investigating a stolen car when they encountered Pierce and Crooms, who were borrowing the vehicle. Officer Santiago-Miranda shot and killed Pierce and Crooms when the vehicle drove forwards in the direction of the officer.
December 4	Casey Goodson	23	Columbus, Ohio	A sheriff's deputy shot and killed Goodson as the deputy drove past Goodson's grandmother's home, which he was entering. The deputy claimed he shot Goodson after he pointed a gun at him, but a prosecutor stated he was holding a sandwich and keys, had a strapless gun holster around his waist, and that Goodson's gun was located on a counter in the kitchen. The deputy who shot Goodson was charged with murder and reckless homicide. In 2024, Franklin County settled for $7 million in exchange for Goodson's family dismissing their federal civil rights lawsuit against both the county and the deputy who shot and killed Goodson. A second murder trial, after the first ended due to the jury not being able to come to consensus, for the former deputy is set to begin in 2026.
December 17	Johnny Lorenzo Bolton	49	Smyrna, Georgia	Police served a no-knock warrant against Bolton. When Bolton stood up, a deputy shot him twice. A jury recommended charges against the deputy who shot Bolton.
December 22	Andre Hill	47	Columbus, Ohio	Two officers were responding to a call of a vehicle being turned off and on when one of them shot Hill, who was leaving a friend's garage. Hill was holding a phone at the time. Officer Adam Coy was indicted on murder and several other charges in 2021.

== 2021 ==
Total for 2021: 31

Date	Name	Age	City	Description
January 1	Carl Dorsey	39	Newark, New Jersey	Undercover Officer Rod Simpkins responded after hearing gunfire and shot Dorsey. Simpkins was not wearing a body camera but surveillance footage showed Dorsey was unarmed. Dorsey's death was the first Newark Police shooting since before 2020, which had gone without a single shooting.
January 1	Akeem Terrell	31	Phoenix, Arizona	Police were called after Terrell, who had schizophrenia, refused to leave a party. Police arrested Terrell and transported him to jail, where Terrell believed he had been taken to a fake facility. Police put Terrell in a prone position and held him down, with as many as seven officers on top of him at one point. After checking on Terrell through a cell door after six minutes and seeing him motionless, officers performed CPR, but Terrell died at the hospital. An autopsy listed positional asphyxia as among the factors that killed him.
January 10	Patrick Warren	52	Killeen, Texas	Responding to a mental health call, Officer Reynaldo Contreras tased and shot Patrick Warren as he approached the officer waving his arms. A grand jury declined to indict Contreras.
January 13	Lymond Moses	30	Wilmington, Delaware	Police pursued Moses while investigating stolen vehicles. After the chase entered a dead-end, Moses turned around and faced his vehicle towards officers and drove forwards. One officer shot Moses as the car began angling to the left, then fired several more times as he drove away.
February 4	Jenoah Donald	30	Hazel Dell, Washington	Deputies pulled Donald over for a broken taillight. After the situation escalated, a deputy attempted to pull Donald from his vehicle. A second deputy shot Donald, later saying she feared he was reaching for an object, which a lawyer for Donald's family stated was a cordless drill.
February 13	Daverion Kinard	29	Fontana, California	Kinard, who was previously spotted breaking and entering into a house, was found sitting inside a portable toilet by an officer, and would be fatally shot after unrolling his right hand to reveal a metallic object which was later determined to be a lighter.
April 7	James Lionel Johnson	38	Takoma Park, Maryland	David Hall Dixon, an off-duty officer with the Pentagon Force Protection Agency, shot Johnson and Williams, who he believed had stolen a car. The two men were shot after they had passed Dixon, and both were shot in the back. Dixon was charged with two counts of second-degree murder.
April 7	Dominique Williams	32	Takoma Park, Maryland	David Hall Dixon, an off-duty officer with the Pentagon Force Protection Agency, shot Johnson and Williams, who he believed had stolen a car. The two men were shot after they had passed Dixon, and both were shot in the back. Dixon was charged with two counts of second-degree murder.
April 11	Daunte Wright	20	Brooklyn Center, Minnesota	After pulling Wright over, officers attempted to arrest him for an outstanding warrant. Following a struggle, Wright reentered his car, Kimberly Potter shot him. Wright drove several blocks before hitting another vehicle. The chief of Brooklyn Center Police said the officer who shot Wright meant to use her taser.
April 14	Lindani Myeni	29	Honolulu, Hawaii	Police shot and killed Myeni outside a house after a woman called to report he had broken into the building. Myeni's wife and her lawyer say Myeni mistook the house for a nearby temple. Prosecutor Steve Alm declined to file charges against the officers involved.
April 21	Andrew Brown Jr.	42	Elizabeth City, North Carolina	While serving a warrant on Brown for drug distribution, Brown attempted to drive away, backing his vehicle before turning left, grazing an officer. Police shot at Brown 14 times, 13 of which were fired as Brown drove away.
May 3	La'Mello Parker	3 months	Biloxi, Mississippi	Parker, a three-month-old baby, was abducted by his father Eric Derell Smith after he killed Parker's mother and her nephew in Louisiana. Following a chase, a shootout occurred between Smith and police, and Parker was shot.
May 4	Latoya James	37	Woodbine, Georgia	James was visiting her cousin Varshan Brown when deputies served a narcotics warrant. A shootout occurred between Brown and the deputies, and James was accidentally shot. Brown was charged with James's death, and the two deputies were not indicted.
June 1	Renardo Green	51	Annapolis, Maryland	Police were called to Green's apartment after his wife said he was under the influence of PCP. Police and paramedics restrained Green face-down, and he suffered a cardiac arrest, dying in a hospital days later. His death was ruled a homicide due to being restrained on his stomach, preventing breathing, with drug use also contributing to his death.
June 13	Eric Cole	42	Springfield, Ohio	Cole called 911 to report someone shot him in the shoulder and that he was in the middle of the street. Dispatchers did not inform the responding officer that Cole was in the road, and when the officer arrived she drove over Cole. The coroner's report stated that Cole was killed by blunt force trauma from being struck by the police cruiser.
June 16	Jermaine Sonnier	19	Houston, Texas	Police pulled Sonnier over during a drug investigation. After he ran, police tased and struggled with Sonnier, who complained of difficulty breathing. He was taken to a hospital, where he died. His death was ruled a homicide due to "arrhythmia associated with acute methamphetamine toxicity during physical pursuit and restraint."
June 22	Frederick Holder	28	Norwalk, California	Deputies attempted to pull over Holder after seeing his van driving erratically. As they approached the car, they saw Holder holding an L-shaped object and fired. Holder was carrying a butane lighter with a handle.
July 6	Leneal Frazier	40	Minneapolis, Minnesota	Frazier was killed when his vehicle was struck by a police vehicle that was pursuing another vehicle in a high-speed chase. Frazier was an uninvolved bystander. The police officer pleaded guilty to vehicular homicide for causing Frazier's death.
July 10	James Holland Sr.	37	Avondale, Arizona	Police responded to reports that a man walking in the street and encounter Holland, in a state of psychosis and only wearing boxers and tennis shoes. Officers tased Holland several times, with one officer placing her knee on his back before tasing him. He began foaming at the mouth and later died. His death was ruled a homicide.
July 26	Damien Cameron	29	Braxton, Mississippi	Deputy Hunter Elward responded to a report that Cameron was burglarizing his home. Elward and another deputy tasered, tackled, and punched Cameron before restraining and arresting him. The Mississippi Chief Medical Examiner said Cameron's cause of death was undetermined, but three pathologists consulted by The New York Times argued the death should have been ruled a homicide. Edward was later one of six officers who tortured two black men at a home in Braxton.
August 24	Tory Brown	22	College Park, Georgia	Police attempted to arrest Brown for violating his parole. When deputies entered his apartment, Brown "quickly advanced toward" them and one deputy shot him. No guns were found at the scene.
August 27	Fanta Bility	8	Sharon Hill, Pennsylvania	After a high school football game ended two teenagers opened fire following a dispute. Officers Brian Devaney, Devon Smith and Sean Dolan fired back, striking four people, including Bility, who died. The two teenagers were initially charged with her death, but those charges were later dropped, and the three officers were charged instead.
September 24	Cedric Lofton	17	Wichita, Kansas	After a report by Lofton's foster family officers took him to the Sedgwick County Juvenile Intake and Assessment Center. After Lofton punched a staff member he was restrained, shackled, and handcuffed. Several minutes later, staff members were unable to find a pulse, and Lofton died at a hospital two days later. An autopsy ruled his death a homicide.
October 4	Michael Craig	61	Chicago, Illinois	Craig called police to report his wife was threatening him with a knife. Officer Alberto Covarrubias arrived on the scene and shot Craig. Craig's wife was charged with stabbing him.
October 10	Kenneth Anderson	42	Houston, Texas	Police were called after Anderson was involved in a single-car accident. Sheriff's deputies attempted to arrest Anderson after learning he had an open warrant. Police tased Anderson multiple times and brought him to a processing center, where he fell unconscious. He was taken to a hospital where he was pronounced dead.
October 11	Jermaine Jones	24	Augusta, Georgia	During a traffic stop, Jones attempted to run away, leading an officer to use his taser on him. Jones fell to the ground and hit his head. He was taken to a hospital, where he died a week later. His death was ruled a homicide. The deputies involved were cleared of wrongdoing.
October 13	Jim Rogers	54	Pittsburgh, Pennsylvania	Police responded after Rogers, who was homeless, was accused of stealing a bicycle, although the bike's owner stated she was giving it away and Rogers was taking it for a test ride. Police tased Rogers eight times; he fell unconscious and died a day later at a hospital. An autopsy ruled his death was accidental. Five officers were fired for their roles in Rogers's death.
October 14	Calvin Wilks Jr.	40	Crestview, Florida	Police responding to reports of a person shouting for help. Police tased Wilks, who fell unconscious and died. His death was ruled a homicide, and Officers Brandon Hardaway, William Johns and Evan Reynolds were indicted for manslaughter.
November 6	Eldred Wells Sr.	70	Joliet, Illinois	Deputies Nick Binnendyk and Desmond Warren responded to a domestic disturbance and found 21-year-old Jabbar Muhammad and Wells, his grandfather. When Muhammad began to stab Wells, police fired, killing both men.
December 5	Quadry Sanders	29	Lawton, Oklahoma	Officers Robert Hinkle and Nathan Ronan responded to reports that Sanders was holding a gun in his home and not letting a resident leave. The two officers fired at Sanders a total of 15 times. No weapon was found on or near Sanders, and he was holding a cap when he was shot. The two officers were later charged with first-degree manslaughter.
December 10	Terence Caffey	30	Little Rock, Arkansas	An off-duty deputy working security at a movie theater attempted to arrest Caffey after he allegedly fought with theater workers. The deputy restrained Caffey, who fell unconscious and died. His death was ruled a homicide. The Pulaski County prosecutor declined to file charges against the deputy.
December 26	James Lowery	40	Titusville, Florida	Following an assault report police pursued Lowery for a warrant. After he threw a bag of narcotics over a fence and tried to climb it, Officer Joshua Payne fired both his firearm and taser, striking Lowery. Payne was charged with manslaughter in 2022.

== 2022 ==
Total for 2022: 38

Date	Name	Age	City	Description
January 8	Jason Walker	37	Fayetteville, North Carolina	An off-duty sheriff's deputy shot and killed Walker after he allegedly jumped on the hood of the deputy's vehicle. A witness says Walker was shot while he was on the ground.
January 30	Dyonta Quarles Jr.	20	Crofton, Maryland	Police responded to a report of a domestic dispute. They encountered Quarles, who charged at an officer, and a struggle occurred, with a stun gun failing to work. When the officers had Quarles restrained, he bit Officer J. Ricci's finger, and Ricci shot him.
February 6	Robert "Junior" Langley	46	Georgetown County, South Carolina	Officer Cassandra Dollard of the Hemingway Police Department in Williamsburg County attempted to pull over Langley for disregarding a stop sign. After a chase, Langley crashed his car into a ditch in Georgetown County. As Langley attempted to exit his vehicle, Dollard shot him once in the chest. Dollard was charged with voluntary manslaughter.
February 19	Donnell Rochester	18	Baltimore, Maryland	Officers attempted to perform a traffic stop for failure to appear in court on a carjacking charge. Police shot Rochester after his vehicle moved forwards. On a search and seizure warrant officers stated that Rochester had struck an officer, but bodycam footage showed the officer say the car did not hit him.
February 22	Tracy Gaeta	54	Stockton, California	An officer pursued Gaeta after she was suspected of hitting a police vehicle in her car. After a pursuit Gaeta backed up at a dead-end, and the officer fired 18 times. After firing several more shots, the vehicle pulled forward and reversed away from the officer. The officer then fired again over a dozen times.
March 1	Quantez Burks	37	Beaver, West Virginia	Correctional officers beat Burks to death in a surveillance camera blind spot at the Southern Regional Jail. Eight officers were charged with connection with his death.
March 11	Tyrea Pryor	39	Independence, Missouri	Police pursued Pryor after he yelled and banged on a man's door. Following a chase, his car crashed, pinning the driver, Pryor, inside. As police removed a front seat and backseat passenger, one officer attempted to remove an AR-15 from the back of the vehicle. An officer outside yelled that there was a gun, leading police to shoot Pryor. Aside from the AR-15 being removed from the car, no weapons were found in the vehicle.
April 4	Patrick Lyoya	26	Grand Rapids, Michigan	Officer Christopher Schurr attempted to arrest Lyoya following a traffic stop. The two struggled over Schurr's taser. During the struggle Schurr shot him in the back of the head. Schurr was charged with second-degree murder.
April 25	Herman Whitfield	39	Indianapolis, Indiana	Police responding to a mental health call used a stun gun on Whitfield and restrained him despite him saying he could not breathe. The coroner's officer ruled Whitfield's death a homicide and said he died from "cardiopulmonary arrest in the setting of law enforcement subdual, prone restraint and conducted electrical weapon use".
April 27	Jalen Randle	29	Houston, Texas	An officer shot Randle after a chase after he exited his vehicle. The officer who shot him started to give a command but fired before finishing his sentence, hitting Randle in the back of the neck. Randle was holding a shoe and a bag with a firearm in it.
May 4	Rogers Kyaruzi	30	Atlanta, Georgia	An officer working a part-time job responded to a disturbance where Kyaruzi attempted to follow a person into a restaurant. The officer and Kyaruzi fought, and the officer shot Kyaruzi after he allegedly tried to reach for the officer's gun.
May 10	Gregory Walker	65	Romeoville, Illinois	Walker entered a bank with a handgun and took several people hostage. After a SWAT team arrived and negotiated with Walker, he released the hostages and prepared to surrender. Walker put his gun down and walked towards the entrance with his hands raised, but a SWAT sniper accidentally shot and killed him.
May 25	Abe Banks	53	Winn Parish, Louisiana	Police responded to reports of a disturbance in Jonesboro and chased Banks onto the highway. After Banks' vehicle suffered a mechanical failure he stopped in the roadway. Deputies shot Banks after he did not follow their commands.
June 13	Jovontay Williams	32	Charlotte, North Carolina	Police responded to reports of a shooting at a home. After disarming and arresting Williams, police restrained him. Officers called for medical assistance after Williams said he couldn't breathe, but medics took 22 minutes to respond, during which Williams lost consciousness. He died, and his death was determined to be due to positional asphyxia.
June 27	Jayland Walker	25	Akron, Ohio	Walker, 25, was shot following an attempted traffic stop and foot chase. Officers fired more than 90 bullets at Walker, who sustained 60 wounds. Footage of the shooting was released one week later, on July 3, 2022.
June 27	Michael Charles Thompson	36	El Paso, Texas	An off-duty Texas Tech University Police officer working security at a Walmart followed Thompson in the store. He left and entered a nearby gas station, asking the clerk to call police for a mental health crisis. Several El Paso Police officers arrived and tased, choked, punched and kicked Thompson. He was taken to a hospital, where he was pronounced dead. His cause of death was restraint asphyxia, use of taser deployments, and multiple force blunt force trauma, and his manner of death was ruled homicide.
July 7	Brett Rosenau	15	Albuquerque, New Mexico	During a standoff with a man wanted for a parole violation, the man and Rosenau fled into a home. Police fired a pepper-spray canister, which set a mattress on fire and sparked a house fire. The other man left the house and was arrested, while Rosenau stayed inside and died of smoke inhalation. His death was ruled a homicide.
July 8	Roderick Brooks	47	Houston, Texas	Deputy Garrett Hardin responded to a shoplifting report at a Dollar General and encountered Brooks. After Hardin tased and restrained Brooks a struggle occurred, and Hardin shot Brooks in the back of the head. Bodycam footage shows Brooks grab the taser, but he had never pointed the taser at Hardin and let go of it by the time Hardin shot him.
July 20	Jason Lipscomb	21	Gastonia, North Carolina	Police responded to reports Lipscomb had kidnapped children he knew, driving them to his mother and stepfather's home. As officers surrounded his vehicle he backed up, hitting an officer, before attempting to drive forward, away from officers. Police fired more than a dozen times.
July 21	Raymond Chaluisant	18	New York City, New York	An off-duty corrections officer shot at a car where Chaluisant, who had a gel blaster, was a passenger. It is unclear if the gel blaster was fired, but the Correction Officers' Benevolent Association claimed the gel blaster had hit the officer in the back. The corrections officer failed to report the shooting and was arrested the next day; according to his lawyer, the corrections officer had not realized he had hit anyone as after he fired the shot, the car had driven away. The corrections officer was indicted in August with a further hearing scheduled for November.
July 28	Kyle Dail	30	Dallas, Texas	Police attempted to arrest Dail after a reported drug deal. According to police Dail pulled out a firearm and threw it down an aisle, shortly after which an officer shot him.
August 2	Presley Eze	36	Las Cruces, New Mexico	Police responded to reports that a shirtless man had taken a beer from a gas station without paying. Police questioned Eze and after failing to identify him attempted to arrest him, resulting in a struggle. Officer Brad Lunsford shot Eze as he was on top of another officer. He was charged with manslaughter for the shooting in October 2023.
August 21	Nasanto Antonio Crenshaw	17	Greensboro, North Carolina	Police pursued a stolen car after it fled a traffic stop. After being stopped a second time, several occupants left while the driver drove forward, hitting a police car. Police then fired, hitting Crenshaw.
August 30	Donovan Lewis	20	Columbus, Ohio	Police served a warrant at Lewis's apartment for improperly handling a firearm, assault, and domestic violence. When police entered Lewis's bedroom an officer shot him after he sat up in bed with an object in his hand. No weapon was found on Lewis, but a vape pen was found nearby.
September 5	Maalik Roquemore	32	Cleveland, Ohio	An officer with the Cuyahoga Metropolitan Housing Authority (CMHA) was patrolling when Roquemore, who had schizophrenia, flagged him down. As the officer exited his vehicle, Roquemore ran to the officer and began punching him. After using his taser, the officer pulled his gun. Roquemore ran away before turning back and running back towards the officer, at which point the officer shot him.
September 14	Genesis Hicks	26	Frisco, Texas	Police approached Hicks after he was accused of using false identification to buy a car from a dealership. When Hicks ran, police tased him, causing him to hit his head on the ground. Hicks fell into a coma and died two weeks later on September 29.
September 24	Ali Osman	34	Phoenix, Arizona	An officer shot and killed Osman after he allegedly picked up a rock and prepared to throw it at the officer's car. The district attorney declined to file charges against the officer, who was fired for the shooting in 2024.
September 25	Jaylen Lewis	25	Jackson, Mississippi	Officers with the Mississippi Capitol Police pulled Lewis over during a drug investigation. Police said Lewis backed his car into a police vehicle, after which two officers opened fire, killing him. The two officers who shot Lewis were later charged with manslaughter.
October 5	Gershun Freeman	33	Memphis, Tennessee	Freeman, who was nude, died after being assaulted at the Shelby County Jail.
October 25	James Wilborn	35	Atlanta, Georgia	Wilborn and a female friend were in a car when Wilborn's ex-girlfriend recognized him and climbed onto the hood of his vehicle. Wilborn attempted to drive off, causing his ex-girlfriend to fall, which was witnessed by an off-duty officer. The officer approached Wilborn, who exited his vehicle, and the two fought before the officer shot Wilborn once.
November 1	Eric Allen	39	Mount Juliet, Tennessee	Police pulled over a vehicle where Allen was a passenger, and the driver was fined for driving without a license or insurance. After Allen was asked to retrieve a dog from the vehicle, he rolled up the passenger-side window and raised his hands. When Sergeant Josh Lo opened the passenger door, Allen moved to the driver's seat and began driving away as Lo entered the vehicle. Lo used a taser, then shot Allen.
November 4	Marando Salmon	36	Stone Mountain, Georgia	Two officers responded to Salmon's home after a report of a stolen car parked in his driveway. When they entered Salmon's room, one of the officers shot Salmon after he threw a phone at them, which officer said they mistook for a knife. The Georgia Bureau of Investigation initially stated Salmon had reached for a gun, but the district attorney later said the gun was holstered and not near him. The two officers involved were later indicted.
November 10	Ki'Azia Miller	27	Detroit, Michigan	Police were called by Miller's mother, who reported her daughter was experiencing a mental health crisis and had been diagnosed with schizophrenia, stating Miller had hit her child. Police found Miller dressed in her underwear, with one officer seemingly hiding behind a tree, as filmed by Miller. Two officers then entered the home and a struggle occurred, ending with an officer shooting Miller, stating she was reaching for his gun. Detroit Police Chief James White recommended the three total officers involved be suspended without pay, although only the two officers who entered the home were.
November 19	Immanueal Clark-Johnson	30	Portland, Oregon	Police surrounded Clark-Johnson's vehicle for matching a general description of a vehicle involved in an earlier armed robbery. Clark-Johnson exited and ran away, and Officer Christopher Sathoff, stating he believed Clark-Johnson was reaching for a weapon, shot him in the back with an AR-15 rifle. Clark-Johnson died two days later. He was not involved in the armed robbery, and the officers who followed him had not been informed that there was surveillance footage of the robber's vehicle, or that the victims said the suspects were four white males.
November 21	Eric Holmes	19	Morrow, Georgia	An officer investigating a stolen vehicle found it in a parking lot. Holmes approached the officer and spoke to him but did not mention any connection to the vehicle. Shortly after, he entered the vehicle and began to drive away, with the officer firing several shots, hitting Holmes in the back, and Holmes crashing nearby. The officer was allowed to resign before he would be terminated.
November 29	Kenneth Knotts	41	Dallas, Texas	Police in Hutchin took Knotts into custody after reports of him walking on top of his vehicle with his 3-year-old son, during which he told officers he believed police and the government were trying to kill him. He was taken to UT Southwestern Medical Center. Several hours later officers with the hospital's police department responded to a disturbance in his room and Knotts fled the scene. He was found outside, where officers tased him several times. His condition deteriorated and he died, and his death was later declared a homicide.
December 12	Joshua Leon Wright	36	Kyle, Texas	Wright, who was in jail for misdemeanor charges, was taken to a hospital in Kyle for medical treatment. After asking to use the bathroom, Wright pushed pass corrections officer Isaiah Garcia and attempted to run away. Garcia shot Wright, who fell into a medical cart. He was indicted in April 2023 for the shooting.
December 31	Keith Murriel	41	Jackson, Mississippi	Police tasered Murriel after responding to a trespassing call at a hotel. He was placed in a police vehicle, where he died. Three officers were fired; two were later charged with murder and the third with manslaughter.

== 2023 ==
Total for 2023: 32

Date	Name	Age	City	Description
January 7	Tyre Nichols	29	Memphis, Tennessee	Nichols was pulled over for suspected reckless driving. Police beat, pepper sprayed, and tased Nichols, who was taken to the hospital, dying three days later on January 10. A preliminary autopsy found he suffered "extensive bleeding caused by a severe beating." The five officers involved in the incident were fired, as well as two EMTs. The five officers were later charged with murder.
January 17	Darryl Williams	32	Raleigh, North Carolina	Police used stun guns on Williams while trying to arrest him. He died, and his death was later ruled a homicide due to cocaine intoxication, physical exertion, conducted energy weapon use, and physical restraint.
February 3	Alonzo Bagley	43	Shreveport, Louisiana	Police responded to a reported domestic disturbance at an apartment complex, where Bagley fled from an apartment balcony. After a foot pursuit Officer Alexander Tyler shot Bagley in the chest as he rounded an apartment corner. No weapons were found on or near Bagley. Tyler was arrested for negligent homicide several weeks later.
February 22	Timothy McCree Johnson	37	Tysons, Virginia	Police were called to a Nordstrom store at Tysons Corner Center by loss prevention officers who reported a man was stealing sunglasses. Two officers chased the suspected thief, Johnson to a nearby wooded area and shot him. No weapons were found on or near Johnson. One of the officers, Sergeant Wesley Shiffett, was later fired.
February 24	James Lanier	34	Wallace, North Carolina	Police responded to reports of a naked man disturbing customers at a convenience store and encountered Lanier. An officer shot Lanier after he repeatedly moved closer, firing three shots, one of which hit. The district attorney said the shooting was justified.
March 5	Dexter Wade	37	Jackson, Mississippi	Wade died after he was struck and killed by an off-duty police officer driving along I-55. Although authorities identified Wade immediately and his family filed a missing person's report nine days later, they were not notified of his death for 172 days, after his body had been buried in a potter's field.
March 6	Irvo Otieno	28	Dinwiddie, Virginia	Seven deputies from the Henrico County Sheriff's Office took an inmate, Otieno, to a mental health facility. During the intake process Otieno became combative with deputies, who restrained him. Otieno died, and the seven deputies were charged with second-degree murder about a week later. Three hospital employees were also charged.
March 18	Delaneo Martin	17	Washington, D.C.	United States Park Police officers found Martin sleeping in a stolen vehicle. After surrounding the vehicle, one officer entered the backseat and ordered Martin not to move. Martin began driving away, and the officer in the backseat shot him.
April 11	Jamarr Thompson	42	Houston, Texas	An officer approached Thompson with his gun-drawn as Thompson sat in a stolen vehicle. After Thompson reversed into the officer's vehicle he stepped out with his hands raised, and the officer grabbed him before the two fought. After the two struggled on the ground for a minute, the officer drew his gun and fired. A friend of Thompson who gave the officer his taser after it fell on the ground was charged with interfering with public duties.
June 6	Calvin Cains III	18	Metairie, Louisiana	Police approached Cains, suspected of a road rage shooting, as he sat in a stolen vehicle in a parking garage. Deputies pulled their vehicles in front of his. Cains reversed his car, then turned and drove between the wall and the police car. As this happened, a deputy walking towards the scene shot through the windshield, killing Cains.
June 24	Jarveon Hudspeth	21	Memphis, Tennessee	Hudspeth died after being fatally shot by a Shelby County Sheriff's deputy during a traffic stop. In October 2023, District Attorney Steve Mulroy declined to file criminal charges against the deputy.
July 2	Jawan Dallas	36	Mobile, Alabama	Police encountered Dallas while responding to reports of a burglary. Officers tased Dallas, who fell unconscious and died at a hospital. An attorney for Dallas's family claimed he was 200 yards away when the burglary occurred and that eyewitnesses saw two white women and a light-skinned man fleeing the scene.
July 3	Jarrell Garris	37	New Rochelle, New York	Police were called to a supermarket after report of a man stealing fruit. Police scuffled with Garris, and Detective Steven Conn shot Garris after he allegedly reached for the officer's weapon.
July 3	Ahmad Abdullah	25	Huntington, West Virginia	An officer responded to a report of a man sitting near a gas meter with a lighter and claiming he had a gun. The officer encountered Abdullah and shot him after he charged at the officer.
July 28	Freddie Walker	60	Louisville, Georgia	Sheriff deputies from the Burke County sheriff's office responded to a report of a "combative mental subject". When they arrived, they first talked to Walker about being taken to a hospital for a mental evaluation. Allegedly, Walker then tried to strike a paramedic, but stopped and was calmed down by the deputies. While the deputies were trying to get Walker inside on a vehicle, a second quarrel occurred and Walker was tased, restrained. Walker was later pronounced dead at a hospital. No chargers were filed in relation to Walker's death.
July 31	Ricky Cobb II	33	Minneapolis, Minnesota	Troopers pulled Cobb over for not having taillights. After troopers asked him to exit his vehicle Cobb began to drive away, at which point a trooper on the passenger side fired two shots.
August 5	Brandon Cole	36	Denver, Colorado	Police responded to a domestic disturbance. During the call, Cole lunged at an officer holding a black marker, which police mistook for a knife. An officer fired, killing Cole.
August 10	Johnny Hollman	62	Atlanta, Georgia	Hollman called police following a car accident. After police responded they determined Hollman was at fault and attempted to arrest him, tasing him. Hollman became unresponsive and died.
August 18	Tahmon Wilson	20	Martinez, California	Police responded to an alarm at a cannabis dispensary, though there was no indication from police or the dispensary that a burglary occurred. After police arrived, Tahmon Wilson and his brother Tommy Wilson attempted to drive away. Four officers fired into the vehicle, killing Tahmon and wounding Tommy.
August 18	Jaquan Fletcher	32	Pontiac, Michigan	Police responded to a report of a vehicle blocking a driveway and found Fletcher sleeping inside. After removing a gun from the car and placing it on the roof, police attempted to arrest Fletcher. A deputy shot and killed Fletcher after he put the vehicle into drive with the deputy hanging out.
August 23	Kyeiree Myers	28	Washington Park, Illinois	During a traffic stop a Washington Park officer approaches Myers and fought with him. Myers broke free and stole a police car, driving it into a nearby pole before an officer shot him. Myers drove to another county, where he exited the vehicle and died when a police car struck him.
August 24	Ta'Kiya Young & unborn baby	21	Blendon Township, Ohio	Young was sitting in her car outside a Kroger when two police officers approached the car and demanded multiple times that Young exit the vehicle. One officer stood beside the driver's door and another stood in front of the vehicle. Young remained behind the wheel and told the officers that she did not steal anything. After about one minute, Young turned the steering wheel and the officer in front of the car drew his pistol. As the car lurched forward, the officer fired one shot through the windshield, killing Young and her unborn baby. The officer was acquitted of all charges, including murder.
September 1	Daryl Vance	71	Detroit, Michigan	An officer responded to a disorderly conduct call at a bowling alley and encountered Vance, the subject of the call. They argued, and the officer punched Vance, causing him to fall and hit his head on the pavement. Vance died of his injuries several weeks later. The officer was fired and charged with manslaughter, though the charges were dismissed.
September 6	Dhal Pothwi	17	DeWitt, New York	Mo and Pothwi died after an Onondaga County sheriff's deputy shot into the stolen vehicle they were in, causing it to crash a short time later. One of the boys died from gunshot wounds, while the other died from injuries sustained from the crash. Sources say that the driver of the car attempted to run the deputy over.
September 6	Lueth Mo	15	DeWitt, New York	Mo and Pothwi died after an Onondaga County sheriff's deputy shot into the stolen vehicle they were in, causing it to crash a short time later. One of the boys died from gunshot wounds, while the other died from injuries sustained from the crash. Sources say that the driver of the car attempted to run the deputy over.
October 12	Emmanuel Millard	20	Roswell, Georgia	Woodstock Police pursued Millard after he fled a traffic stop. After police performed a PIT maneuver on the car, an officer shot Millard as he exited the car. The officer was indicted for involuntary manslaughter in April 2024.
October 16	Leonard Cure	53	Camden County, Georgia	Police attempted to arrest Cure during a traffic stop. After being tased, Cure fought the lone deputy, grabbing him by the face and throat. The deputy attempted to use his taser and baton to stop the attack before shooting Cure.
October 24	Darcel Edwards	35	Indianapolis, Indiana	Police pursued Edwards after he fled a traffic stop. After an officer discovered his vehicle crashed in an intersection, police searched for Edwards and found him up in a nearby tree. Edwards refused to get down and reportedly told officers to shoot him, and an officer shot Edwards when he reached for his pocket. A gun holster was found on Edwards, but no weapons were.
October 28	Vernard Toney Jr.	13	Washington, D.C.	Toney and a 12-year-old boy approached an off-duty U.S. Marshal as he sat in his vehicle before his shift. They demanded the officer exit his car, with one of them holding his hand in his waistband pocket as if he had a gun. The officer exited his vehicle and shot Toney. The officer's handgun was the only gun recovered from the scene. The 12-year-old was later turned in by his mother.
October 29	LaVaughn Coleman	21	Odenton, Maryland	Police arrested Coleman and another man after they were reported for being in a car with guns and drugs. Coleman ran as he was being handcuffed, leading a trooper to tase him. Coleman hit his head and fell unconscious; he died of his injuries in December.
November 1	Breonte Johnson-Davis	36	Palmetto, Florida	A clerk at a Circle K convenience store called Palmetto Police after reporting that Davis was aggressive with staff and customers. When police arrived, Davis allegedly ran up to the officer's squad car and begin banging on the driver's window. Davis also allegedly jumped on the hood of the patrol car and began rolling around. Davis continued resisting arrest and was tased, leading to him having a medical episode. Davis would later succumb to his injuries at a hospital on November 3.
November 23	Demarcus Brodie	49	Fayetteville, North Carolina	Fayetteville Police Officer Dillion Hoke shot Brodie after allegedly having a physical altercation with Brodie during a traffic stop.
December 13	Tony Cox	33	Pontiac, Michigan	Deputies pulled over Cox, saying his vehicle looked similar to one involved in a recent shooting. Cox fled, driving past deputies, before they performed a PIT maneuver and Cox crashed. Cox exited his vehicle with his hands clasped and pointed at officers, and one of them fired a shot. Several other officers then shot Cox as he ran away.

== 2024 ==
Total for 2024: 22

Date	Name	Age	City	Description
January 10	Craig Cousin	41	Owings Mills, Maryland	Police responded to reports of an erratic man at a Taco Bell drive-thru. Officers, alongside Cousin's wife and step-father, restrained him, but he fell unconscious and died en route to the hospital. Although Cousin's wife said he had taken some pills, a tests for over 1200 drugs came back negative, and his death was ruled a homicide.
January 24	Clifford Brooks	41	Washington, D.C.	Police had Brooks transported in an ambulance during a mental health call. After Brooks allegedly assaulted medical personnel and fled the ambulance, police followed him to a truck. Brooks exited from underneath the truck holding an air pressure gauge and charged at officers, who shot him.
February 3	Roshod Graham	30	Lauderhill, Florida	Allegedly chased his girlfriend into a gas station convenience store, ramming the entrance with his vehicle. Shot during pursuit, after fleeing from the scene on foot upon the police's arrival. Officer claims Graham reached for their weapon, resulting in fatal shooting.
February 3	Isaac Goodlow III	30	Carol Stream, Illinois	After responding to a domestic violence incident involving Goodlow, he was fatally shot by Carol Stream police officers inside his apartment. A video of the shooting was released on March 1.
March 16	Terrell Miller	4	Macomb, Illinois	Police responded to a call and found Miller's mother with multiple stab wounds. Officers found 57-year-old Anthony T. George, who grabbed Miller and took him hostage at knifepoint. One officer fired a single shot, killing both Miller and George.
March 21	Kadarius Smith	17	Leland, Mississippi	Police were called to a home after asking Smith to leave following a dispute. When officers arrived, Smith fled on foot. An officer in a police cruiser ran over Smith, who died at a hospital. The city attorney for Leland claimed it was an accident.
April 17	Samuel Sterling	25	Kentwood, Michigan	During a foot pursuit, a Michigan State Police sergeant driving an unmarked police vehicle struck and killed Sterling in the parking lot of a Burger King. The following month, Sergeant Brian Keely was charged with second-degree murder and involuntary manslaughter.
April 18	Frank Tyson	53	Canton, Ohio	Canton police officers responded to a report of a crash. A motorist directed police to the bar, where a woman asked the police to get Tyson out of there. Police officers then handcuffed Tyson while he was resisting. They then restrained him with a knee on his back. Five minutes later, officers checked his pulse and found him dead after CPR.
April 20	Jabril Cheevers	14	Waldo, Florida	State troopers pursued a stolen vehicle out of Gainesville. Troopers used a PIT maneuver on the car, causing it to crash into a pole and killing the four occupants, all Newberry High School students.
April 20	Lawrence McClendon	17	Waldo, Florida	State troopers pursued a stolen vehicle out of Gainesville. Troopers used a PIT maneuver on the car, causing it to crash into a pole and killing the four occupants, all Newberry High School students.
April 20	Philemon Moore	16	Waldo, Florida	State troopers pursued a stolen vehicle out of Gainesville. Troopers used a PIT maneuver on the car, causing it to crash into a pole and killing the four occupants, all Newberry High School students.
April 20	Teleak Roberts	16	Waldo, Florida	State troopers pursued a stolen vehicle out of Gainesville. Troopers used a PIT maneuver on the car, causing it to crash into a pole and killing the four occupants, all Newberry High School students.
May 14	Dennis Bodden	46	Pineville, North Carolina	Bodden, suspected of shoplifting at a supermarket, was fatally shot by a Pineville Police Officer after Bodden allegedly reached for an officer's weapon.
May 23	Kilyn Lewis	37	Aurora, Colorado	Officers approached Lewis to arrest him in connection with a drive-by shooting in Denver. When officers approached, Lewis raised his hands in the air while holding a cellphone, and a SWAT officer shot him.
May 26	William Rankin	43	Florence County, South Carolina	Rankin was involved in vehicle pursuit that ended when Rankin crashed into a tree. Afterwards, Rankin ran into a house. Florence County Deputy Treyvon Sellers pursued Rankin into the house and fatally shot Rankin on a couch. In August, Sellers was fired and charged with Rankin's death. He was also charged with assault for letting his K-9 unit maul the uninvolved homeowner.
June 4	Rolin Hill	34	Virginia Beach, Virginia	Sheriff's deputies restrained Hill at a jail after he was arrested for trespassing. He died, and his death was ruled a homicide by asphyxiation. Three sheriff's deputies were charged with murder in connection with his death.
June 5	Michael Brown	52	Milford, Connecticut	Three officers restrained Brown, a suspected shoplifter, outside a supermarket. While being arrested, Brown spat up blood and was taken to the hospital. He died, and his death was ruled a homicide, though the state Inspector General determined there was no criminality in the officer's actions.
June 18	Emeshyon Wilkins	17	St. Louis, Missouri	Police pursued a stolen SUV, with Wilkins exiting and fleeing on foot. An officer shot him as he ran away. Police initially said Wilkins had pointed a gun at officers, but body-camera footage showed he was not holding anything when the officer shot him. Attorneys for his family said he had a disassembled gun in his pocket that was incapable of firing.
July 6	Sonya Massey	36	Woodside Township, Illinois	Massey called police to report a possible prowler in her home. Deputies Sean Grayson and Dawson Farley responded. After searching the area, Massey and the deputies entered her home, and the deputies asked for her ID. Grayson noticed a pot on the stove and requested its removal. Massey then removed the pot of hot water from her stove and said twice, "I rebuke you in the name of Jesus." Massey, who was unarmed, was shot by Grayson after he threatened to shoot her in her face. Grayson was indicted on three counts of first-degree murder. Grayson was convicted of second-degree murder and sentenced to the maximum of 20 years in prison.
August 28	Cameron Ford	37	Omaha, Nebraska	A SWAT officer fatally shot Ford during a no-knock raid after he ran towards them without his hands visible. Ford was unarmed when the officer shot him. The city temporarily paused the use of no-knock warrants in response to the shooting.
September 6	John McCloud	58	Fort Wayne, Indiana	Police responded to a burglary and shot McCloud inside a home. Attorneys for McCloud's family said body-camera footage showed McCloud was on the ground and not armed when he was shot.
October 3	Robert Jones	54	Philadelphia, Pennsylvania	A Philadelphia Police officer and Jones stopped their cars as the officer drove home from work. Jones approached the officer's car, and for unknown reasons the officer shot him.
October 23	Elroy Clarke	42	Punta Gorda, Florida	Deputies responded to reports of a dispute between Clarke and another man. After discovering he had a warrant, deputies attempted to take Clarke into custody. When he resisted, they used tasers, pepper sprays, batons, and beanbag rounds, ultimately shooting him when he allegedly charged at an officer.
December 10	Robert Brooks	43	Marcy, New York	Correctional officers beat Brooks to death while he was handcuffed and compliant at Marcy Correctional Facility, where he was an inmate. New York Governor Kathy Hochul recommended 14 employees involved in his death be fired.
December 30	Richard Johnson	32	Madison, Wisconsin	Police pursued Johnson after he was reported for stealing a car. When arresting him, police handcuffed Johnson in a prone position and an officer used his knee to force Johnson's head on the ground. Johnson fell unconscious and died; his death was initially ruled an accident, but was later determined to be homicide.

== 2025 ==
Total for 2025: 16

Date	Name	Age	City	Description
February 27	Levincer Swanson	36	Houston, Texas	Deputies responded to calls of a man damaging pumps at a gas station. When deputies arrived, one fought with Swanson, getting on top of him as Swanson grabbed at his head. Another deputy then shot Swanson. The deputy who killed Swanson was fired and charged with murder in March 2026.
March 1	Messiah Nantwi	22	Marcy, New York	Correctional officers at the Mid-State Correctional Facility beat Nantwi to death. Nantwi's death occurred about a week after ten employees at Marcy Correctional Facility, also in Marcy, were charged in connection with the death of Robert Brooks in December 2024. 15 employees at Mid-State were placed on leave in connection to Nantwi's death. 10 prison guards would later be charged in connection with Nantwi's death, with two of these guards being charged with murder.
March 6	Wyleek Tinsley	19	Glenside, Pennsylvania	Police responded to reports Tinsley had fired a gun at his girlfriend. Officers entered the apartment after hearing a gunshot and shot Tinsley in a hallway. Tinsley was holding a cellphone when he was shot. His gun was found in a bedroom.
March 6	William Bowen	21	Hartford, Connecticut	Police responded to reports of Bowen displaying a gun on Instagram Live. When officers arrived, Bowen fled, disposing of two guns he had on him. Officers shot Bowen after he emerged from an alleyway.
March 24	Christian Black	25	Dayton, Ohio	Black, a prisoner at the Montgomery County Jail, began banging his head against a cell door. Correctional officers pepper-sprayed Black, shocked him with a stun gun, and placed him in a restraint chair. Black fell unconscious and died; his death was ruled a homicide.
May 5	Tasha Grant	39	Cleveland, Ohio	Grant, an inmate at the Cuyahoga County Jail, was taken to the MetroHealth Medical Center for chest pains on May 2. Three days later, medical staff called for assistance after Grant, who had both legs amputated years prior, threw herself on the ground and refused to cooperate. Three MetroHealth Police officers and a sheriff's deputy restrained Grant on her stomach before handcuffing her to her bed. She was found unresponsive, and her death was declared a homicide.
May 12	Rashaud Johnson	32	Aurora, Colorado	An officer responded to a report of a man in an airport shuttle parking lot. After the officer arrived, he and Johnson had a physical altercation, with Johnson grabbing the officer's vest and a magazine. The struggle ended when the officer shot Johnson as he approached the officer, who was standing against a fence.
May 27	Marco Dorsey	43	Jeffersontown, Kentucky	Residents of a neighborhood called an off-duty officer after Dorsey, another resident, began acting erratically. After Dorsey approached the officer's home, the officer shot him when he allegedly charged towards the officer.
June 24	Dontae Melton	31	Baltimore, Maryland	During a mental health crisis, Melton approached a Baltimore Police officer in his cruiser, saying he was being followed. Police restrained Melton, who fell unconscious and died. His death was ruled a homicide.
June 27	Damon Lamarr Johnson	52	Portland, Oregon	Police were called to Johnson's home for a welfare check, with reports saying Johnson had flooded his apartment and was hanging knives out the window. Police handcuffed Johnson and restrained him facedown. Johnson fell unresponsive and died, and his death was ruled due to prone restraint.
July 2	Marchello Woodard	43	Erie, Pennsylvania	A parole officer shot and killed Woodard as he sat in a vehicle. The officer was charged with criminal homicide in December 2025.
July 5	Charles Adair	50	Kansas City, Kansas	Adair was in jail on failure to appear for traffic violations. As he was returning to his cell from the infirmary, he began yelling and resisting, so sheriff's deputies were called in to restrain him. Deputies restrained him in his cell; shortly after, medical staff found him unconscious. Adair died, and his death was ruled a homicide due to mechanical asphyxia. One of the deputies involved was later charged with second-degree murder.
August 30	Rajon Belt-Stubblefield	37	Aurora, Colorado	After hitting several vehicles during a traffic stop, Belt-Stubblefield exited and threw a gun on the ground. The police chief said Belt-Stubblefield told other people at the scene to "get the shit" while pointing at the handgun. The officer struck Belt-Stubblefield, who reportedly raised his fist and pursued the officer into the street before being shot and killed.
October 18	Doug Martin	36	Oakland, California	Police were called on Martin, a former Oakland Raiders running back, for a break-in and mental health crisis. Five officers restrained Martin, who fell unconscious and died. An autopsy found his cause of death was asphyxiation.
December 6	Nickenley Turenne	24	Manchester, New Hampshire	Police responded to a suspicious vehicle report and found Turenne and his girlfriend sleeping in a car. Turenne drove off and crashed nearby. Police followed Turenne, who put his hands in his sweatshirt and walked away. Turenne turned on a flashlight and pointed it at three officers, who mistook it for a gun and shot him.
December 7	Shacoby Kenny	32	Boston, Massachusetts	Kenny was a detainee at the South Bay House of Correction. Officers attempted to restrain him after he exhibited erratic behavior. Another detainee said that officers beat and handcuffed Kenny, then left him for around 30 minutes to an hour without performing CPR. He was taken to a hospital, where he pronounced dead.

== 2026 ==
Total for 2026: 12

Date	Name	Age	City	Description
January 1	Marcus Burks	39	Newburgh, New York	Police pursued Burks after he fled a traffic stop. After he crashed into another vehicle, police tased and pepper-sprayed him. He died, and his death was ruled a homicide.
January 22	Jaque Rabon	23	Riverside, California	Deputies pursued Rabon, who was wanted on a warrant, through a shopping center parking lot. Deputies shot Rabon after he repeatedly reached for a fanny pack on his person, but he did not have a weapon.
February 16	Samuel Brown	56	Woodlawn, Maryland	An officer approached Brown after he was found sleeping in a car at a stoplight. The two fought, and the officer struck Brown, causing him to hit his head on the concrete. He died of his injuries on February 27.
March 11	Stephenson King	39	Boston, Massachusetts	Police responded to reports of a carjacking in the Roxbury neighborhood. An officer shot and killed King, saying that King had attempted to run him over. However, prosecutors charged the officer with manslaughter, with paperwork stating that witnesses and police body-camera footage contradicted the officer's account.
March 14	Leon Davis	27	Federal Way, Washington	Davis went to a hospital for symptoms of alcohol withdrawal. At some point, security called police, who helped security restrain Davis. Davis fell unconscious and died, and his death was ruled a homicide.
May 1	Saveion McConnell	19	Pittsville, Missouri	Sheriff's deputies investigated a shooting that injured a teenage girl. A sheriff's deputy found McConnell and pursued him, striking him with a police car. The deputy then shot McConnell as he fled on foot. No weapons were found at the scene.
May 18	Randy Martin	47	Galveston, Texas	An officer pulled Martin over for not making complete stop at stop signs. The officer had Martin exit his vehicle so he could pat him down, but Martin allegedly resisted. After a struggle, the officer shot and killed Martin.
June 14	Kohen Wiley	1	Senatobia, Mississippi	Police responded to reports of two women shoplifting diapers from a Walmart and getting into a car. Police said the driver drove towards police, leading an officer to fire. Wiley was struck by police gunfire and killed.
July 7	Seth Jayden Eccles	19	Avondale Estates, Georgia	An officer attempted to arrest Eccles, suspected of robbing a mail carrier. While arresting him, the officer accidentally fired his gun, hitting Eccles. The officer was charged with manslaughter the next day.
July 24	Anthoneil Williams II	17	Austin, Texas	Williams called police on himself to report a teenager with a firearm at a park. When officers arrived, Williams lifted his shirt and reached for his waistband, and three officers shot him. The officers shot again when Williams continued moving on the ground. Police found he had a water bottle in his waistband.
August 10	Dariss Yearby	20	Longmont, Colorado	Police responded to a call that Yearby was threatening to kill a woman he knew at a home. Police found Yearby holding his hand in a bag against the woman's neck; Yearby said he had a gun, but the woman said he did not and was trying to die. Following the initial standoff, another officer arrived and ultimately shot Yearby. No weapon was found in the bag.
October 12	Edwin Michael Adams	56	San Francisco, California	Police attempted to arrest Adams for not charging his ankle monitor. Police said Adams died after he "collided with a street fixture" following a pursuit. Witnesses said a plainclothes officer got out of a van and tackled Adams into a bus shelter, causing his head to hit a metal pole, resulting in his death.

== See also ==
- SayHerName
- Driving while black
- Shooting bias
- Racism against African Americans
- The talk (racism in the United States)
- List of police violence incidents during George Floyd protests
- I can't breathe
- Police brutality in the United States
- Police use of deadly force in the United States
- List of lynching victims in the United States
- 2016 shooting of Dallas police officers: A mass shooting that was motivated by the suspect's anger over the shootings of unarmed black people by police.
- 2016 shooting of Baton Rouge police officers: A mass shooting that was motivated by the shootings of unarmed black people by police.
- 2014 killings of NYPD officers: a shooting that was motivated by the killings of Eric Garner and Michael Brown
- Mark Essex: A man whose killing spree was partially motivated by the police shooting deaths of Leonard Brown and Denver Smith.
