= Portsmouth Police Department =

- Abbreviation: PPD
- Motto: Pride. Professionalism. Dedication.

Agency overview
- Formed: 1873

Jurisdictional structure
- Operations jurisdiction: Portsmouth, Virginia, USA
- Area: 46.68 square miles (120.9 km^{2})
- Population: 97,840
- Governing body: City
- General nature: Local civilian police

Operational structure
- Headquarters: Portsmouth, Virginia

Website
- portsmouthpd.us

The Portsmouth Police Department (PPD) is the primary law enforcement agency in Portsmouth, Virginia. It has about 255 sworn law enforcement officers. Total staff including dispatchers and non-sworn workers is about 380 employees.

== History ==
The Portsmouth Police Department was founded in 1873.

In November 2017, Officer Angelina Baaklini White, who was new to the job, spotted a 15-year-old runaway, Will Patterson Jr., and tried to detain him. Running away is a non-arrestable status offense in Virginia. While White was attempting to handcuff Patterson, he pulled a gun and shot six times. Patterson was charged with twelve felonies, including attempted aggravated murder. Patterson was initially represented by Brenda Spry, who was the Chief Public Defender at Portsmouth's office of the Virginia Indigent Defense Commission at the time. After Patterson was found guilty, but prior to his sentencing, Spry was made aware of his incompetency to stand trial and mental health issues. As a result, his conviction had to be vacated, and a new trial was ordered. Patterson received new counsel, and was convicted again of twelve felonies in September 2022. In April 2023, Patterson was sentenced to 160 years in prison, with 54 years suspended.

In May 2019, Police Chief Tonya Chapman resigned from her position, claiming she was forced to resign and had experienced systemic racism during her tenure. She was replaced by Angela Greene who served as interim chief.

In September 2021, Renado Prince was promoted from Assistant Police Chief to Police Chief. At the end of 2021, Portsmouth reported 35 homicides, its highest number in years, up from 34 in 2020 and 16 in 2019. At the time, the police department had approximately 80 unfilled officer positions. In July 2022, former-Police Chief Tonya Chapman started a position as City Manager. Chapman fired Prince after he sent a text message criticizing her, only one week after she started as city manager. Prince was replaced with Stephen Jenkins. Chapman was later fired by the Portsmouth City Council in January 2023, and Prince was re-hired in June 2023 as an Assistant Police Chief. In 2022, Portsmouth police investigated 42 homicides, a record number for the city. The police chief at the time stated that the department estimated only twenty percent of gunshots in the city were reported to the police.

== Services ==
The Portsmouth Police Department has a variety of services and units. There are four main bureaus, including the Criminal Investigations Bureau, Logistics Branch, Patrol Services Branch, and Professional Standards Unit. The department also has a Community Enhancement Division, Public Information, and the Emergency Stabilization Victim's Fund.

The Criminal Investigations Bureau has eight sections: Major Crimes, Property Crimes, Forensics and AFIS, Long Term Investigations, Short Term Investigations, Gang & Intelligence, Crime Line, and Fugitive Apprehension. Within the bureau, the Criminal Investigations Division is made up of four units: Homicide, General Assignment, Special Victims, and Forensics. The division focuses primarily on the follow-up investigation of burglaries, crimes against children, crimes of domestic violence, gun violence, homicides, robberies, serious assaults, sex crimes, fraud, and theft. The Special Investigations Division is made up of three units: Narcotics, Fugitive Apprehensions, and Street Crimes.

The Logistics Branch, also called the Support Bureau, includes the Administrative Bureau, Police Records Unit, the Property Management Unit, Community Enhancement Division, and the Court Liaison Unit, Animal Control Unit, and the Vehicle Coordinator.

== Line of duty deaths ==
Ten Portsmouth policemen have died in the line of duty, the first in 1871. Four of these died from gunshot wounds.

- Patrolman John Wilson, November 11, 1871
- Patrolman William S. Winningder, August 11, 1908
- Patrolman Elridge Rochelle Story, November 30, 1936
- Officer John J. Nobrega Jr., January 29, 1958
- Officer Vernon Davis, March 5, 1963
- Officer Richard Journee Jr., January 20, 1966
- Sergeant Earl Phillips Wilkins, April 9, 1968
- Motorcycle Patrolman William Harvey Austin, June 18, 1969
- Patrolman Joseph M. Weth Jr., May 28, 1982
- Detective Garland Lindwood Joyner Jr., March 18, 1984
- Police School-Crossing Guard Joyce Hawkins, December 12, 1991

== Brutality, corruption, misconduct, and controversies ==
=== 2011 death of Kirill Denyakin ===
On April 23, 2011, Kirill Denyakin, a citizen of Kazakhstan living in Portsmouth, went to the apartment of a friend, Aileen Putnam, to pick up his laundry. While at his friend's home, he consumed four or five screwdriver cocktails. According to a report in The Virginian-Pilot, Putnam became concerned by Denyakin's behavior and texted her boyfriend. Putnam's boyfriend arrived at her apartment at approximately 7 p.m., and he told Denyakin to go home and sober up. At approximately 9 p.m., Denyakin arrived at Natalya Wilson's apartment on Green Street. Denyakin was still intoxicated, and Wilson and Denyakin got into an argument because Wilson had previously told Denyakin that she did not like seeing him drunk around her baby. Wilson left the apartment and went to the restaurant where her husband worked and asked him and a friend to come home and help with Denyakin. The two men helped Denyakin outside, took away his keys, and set him on the stoop to sober up. Wilson's husband then returned to work.

About one hour later, Denyakin awoke and began pounding on the door. Wilson was alarmed and asked her neighbor to call 9-1-1. During the call, the neighbor implied that Denyakin was "a stranger", and the dispatcher relayed the incident as a burglary in progress. Officer Stephen Rankin was nearby dealing with a homeless man and at 10:10 p.m. told the dispatcher that he would respond to the burglary call. Rankin arrived at the apartment at 10:12 p.m., finding Denyakin standing at the same door of the building where the burglary had been reported. Rankin gave Denyakin verbal commands to turn around, but Denyakin was unresponsive to these commands. Denyakin placed his hands "at the midsection of his body, in the waistband area", before charging at Rankin, who fired his weapon "in an effort to stop the threat". There were no witnesses to the shooting. Additionally, Officer Rankin had not synchronized his duty belt microphone with his vehicle's dashcam, so there was no audio or video recording of the events. The Virginian-Pilot later reported that Wilson had heard officer Rankin order Denyakin to "get down" three times before gunfire erupted; however, less than two minutes had elapsed between Rankin's arrival on the scene and the shooting. Shortly after the shooting, a second officer arrived and found the glass in the front door had been shattered and Denyakin was on the ground. By the time the paramedics arrived, Denyakin was dead. An autopsy determined that Denyakin had 11 bullet wounds in his chest, left shoulder, right upper arm, left thigh, right flank, hip, right wrist, and left hand, and a blood alcohol content of 0.28%.

Initially, the Portsmouth Police Department did not release the officer's identity. Once Officer Rankin was named, his social media activity was scrutinized, including Facebook posts of the Misfits song "Mommy, Can I Go Out & Kill Tonight", an image of a lynching with the slogan "Love is … Doing whatever is necessary," and photographs of Rankin's gun and gun cleaning equipment, on which he had commented that it "would be better if i was dirtying them instead of cleaning them!" The International Association of Chiefs of Police issued a reminder to all officers to use caution when making social media postings. Rankin later admitted to making numerous comments on online articles at the website of The Virginian-Pilot under the pseudonym "yourealythinkthat", defending his actions and disputing other commenters who questioned them.

The government of Kazakhstan paid the expenses for Denyakin's mother to travel to the United States and repatriate her son's body. He was buried in the Federovsky Cemetery in Karaganda in May 2011. Erlan Idrisov, Kazakhstan's ambassador in Washington, DC, made a statement of concern to the United States Department of State, demanded a "thorough investigation", and expressed his hopes that Denyakin's relatives would be "compensated" properly. The Virginia State Police investigated the shooting, and Commonwealth's Attorney Earle C. Mobley referred the investigation to a state grand jury. Rankin was placed on administrative leave during the investigation. On February 9, 2012, the grand jury failed to indict Rankin. Following the lack of criminal charges, the Denyakin family filed a civil suit against Rankin seeking US$22 million in damages. The judge in the civil suit ordered a trial so that a jury could hear the case against the respondents. After three days of testimony, the jury found that Rankin had not violated Denyakin's civil rights by using excessive force, did not act with gross negligence, and did not commit unprovoked assault and battery causing death.

=== 2015 death of William Chapman ===
On April 22, 2015, Wal-Mart store security called police at 7:30 a.m., reporting that a shoplifter was leaving the store. Rankin approached William Chapman across the parking lot, and a struggle between the two ensued. According to witnesses, Chapman broke away from Rankin, but then stepped back towards him, at which point Rankin shot him twice. He was shot in the face and chest. An autopsy on Chapman found no evidence of a close-range gunshot, indicating that he was shot from several feet away. He was pronounced dead at the scene. Chapman's body was taken to the Office of the Chief Medical Examiner with his hands cuffed behind his back. A state toxicology report indicated Chapman had no traces of alcohol or drugs in his system.

The Commonwealth of Virginia's Attorney's Office announced they were seeking an indictment. On September 3, a grand jury indicted Rankin on a charge of first degree murder and use of a firearm in commission of a felony. Rankin turned himself in to a jail and was released on $75,000 bond.

Prosecutors said that Rankin could have used non-lethal force. Rankin's defense said that he had to shoot Chapman after a stun gun failed to stop him. A crane driver stated that Chapman had acted aggressively toward the police officer and had charged at him. However Gregory Provo, a Wal-Mart security guard who reported the allegations of Chapman shoplifting, testified that Chapman never charged at the officer, and had his hands raised in a boxing-style, and said "Are you going to fucking shoot me?" when he was standing six feet (1.8 m) away from Chapman. On August 4, 2016, Rankin was found not guilty by a jury of first-degree murder, but was found guilty on the lesser charge of voluntary manslaughter. He received a sentence of 30 months in October 2016. Rankin was released from the Dillwyn Correctional Center on November 19, 2018. Four years prior to Chapman's death, Rankin shot and killed Kirill Denyakin, but a grand jury failed to indict him for the charges.

=== 2017 shooting of Deontrace Ward ===
In 2017, Officer Jeremy Durocher responded to a burglary in progress. One suspect, Deontrace Ward tried to escape police when they responded. Ward was carrying a loaded gun. Durocher shot and injured Ward. Ward was eventually convicted for his role in the burglary and went to prison. Later, Durocher was inidcted by a grand jury on charges of malicious wounding. The case went to trial in 2023, and Durocher testified that Ward pointed a gun at him and was running towards other police officers with the weapon. Durocher testified that he shot Ward because he was threatening others. The jury found Durocher not guilty. Durocher later filed a lawsuit against the city to be reimbursed for legal fees related to the case.

=== 2018 deaths of Willie Marable and Carmeita Vanglider ===
In 2018, Officer Vincent McClean shot and killed Willie Marable during a home invasion investigation. Prosecutors argued McClean had some responsibility for the man's death because McClean did not provide CPR or other medical attention after shooting Marable. McClean did call for an ambulance. In 2023, a grand jury indicted McClean on voluntary manslaughter charges. At trial, the jury found McClean not guilty. After being acquitted, the city of Portsmouth reimbursed McClean for $142,000 in legal fees.

Immediately following that trial, a different grand jury indicted McClean on a new voluntary manslaughter charge for the December 2018 death of Carmeita "Carly" Vanglider. Vanglider died while in police custody for drug-related charges after having a seizure in a holding cell. She was eleven weeks pregnant at the time. The case went to trial in 2024. The commonwealth's attorney argued that McClean failed to give medical help to Vanglider while she was in custody and that he should have taken her to the hospital instead of the jail. The medical examiner found that VanGilder died from a heart condition which was aggravated by recent cocaine use and huffing Endust compressed air. After the evidence was heard, the judge granted McClean's attorney's motion to strike the charges, agreeing the evidence didn't support voluntary manslaughter.

Following the two trials, McClean filed a $16 million lawsuit against investigators for alleged malicious prosecution.

=== 2020 Confederate monument incident ===
In June 2020, a Black Lives Matter protest took place in Portsmouth and resulted in the vandalism of the local Confederate monument. In August 2020, nineteen people, including state senator Louise Lucas, Chief Public Defender Brenda Spry, two additional public defenders, Portsmouth School Board member LaKeesha Atkinson, and three NAACP representatives were charged with felony vandalism. The charges were announced on August 17, 2020, by Police Chief Angela Greene, one day prior to a special legislative session pushing for policing reform. The Virginia Legislative Black Caucus condemned the charges and multiple Virginia politicians expressed concern about the timing of the charges. In order to obtain the charges, the police department circumvented the commonwealth's attorney, taking the charges directly to the magistrate. Later, the Commonwealth's Attorney Stephanie Morales stated there was insufficient evidence to take any of the nineteen defendants to trial. Due to the fact that so many local attorneys and public officials were charged or subpoenaed as witnesses, judges in Portsmouth recused themselves, and Judge Claire G. Cardwell was brought in from Richmond to hear the case. Cardwell dismissed the charges in November 2020. Judge Cardwell found that police intentionally went around prosecutors to file charges and attempted to prevent Morales from prosecuting the case by subpoenaing her as a witness. Cardwell found the charges concerning and believed the police did not take out the charges out of concern for public safety. Police Chief Angela Greene was fired shortly before the dismissal of the charges. Ten of the individuals who were charged sued the city for violating their rights, claiming that they were improperly defamed. In October 2021, the city settled the lawsuit, writing them checks for $15,000 each.

=== 2022 use of force incident ===
External videos
- Body cam video Portsmouth officer assaults detained person

On October 11, 2022, undercover detectives were conducting a homicide investigation in the early hours of the morning and a group of individuals nearby were making threats. The window of an unmarked police surveillance van was broken, and detectives swarmed the area. They detained two individuals. As one detective placed handcuffs on one of the detainees, another detective, Mario Hunter, ran up to the detainee and punched him in the face. A third detective exclaimed that the individual was complying. The incident was captured on Axon Body camera footage. It was later determined that the man who was punched had nothing to do with the investigation or damaged surveillance van. The police chief, Stephen Jenkins, condemned Hunter's use of force, stating that it was "absolutely not" necessary. Detective Hunter was suspended without pay and was charged with simple assault.

=== 2024 arrest of officer ===
In May 2024, Officer Carmen Johnson was charged with driving under the influence and assault on law enforcement officer in nearby Hampton, Virginia after she drove 100 miles per hour on the interstate and nearly hit a police vehicle conducting a traffic stop. When pulled over, there was an open container of liquor in vehicle. While being arrested, Johnson kicked a Hampton police officer. Johnson made comments about her "dislike of white people" in reference to the arresting officer. Her blood alcohol level was above the legal limit. The Portsmouth Police Department conducted an internal investigation and placed Johnson in a non-law enforcement administrative position during their investigation.
