= List of people from Hampton Roads, Virginia =

Virginian jurisdictions most commonly associated with the Hampton Roads metropolitan area

The following is a list of notable people who were born, raised, or closely associated with the Hampton Roads metropolitan area.

== Chesapeake ==
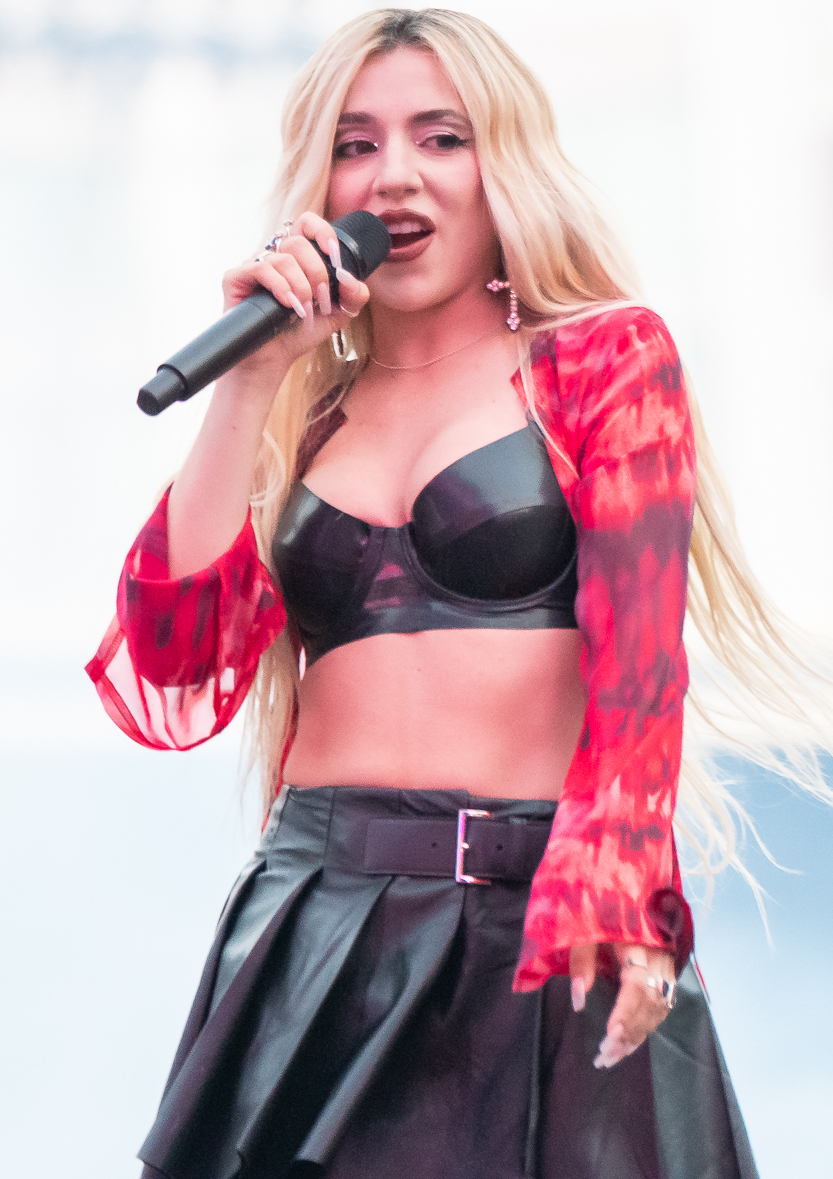
Ava Max

- James Anderson – Carolina Panthers linebacker and 88th overall pick in the 2006 NFL draft
- Ed Beard (1939–2023) – professional football player for the San Francisco 49ers
- Dré Bly (b. 1977) – professional football player with the Denver Broncos
- Randy Blythe (b. 1971) – vocalist and lyricist for groove metal band Lamb of God
- Michael Copon (b. 1982) – star of One Tree Hill and winner of VH1's But Can They Sing?
- Chris Crocker (b. 1980) – professional football player with the Atlanta Falcons
- Michael Cuddyer (b. 1979) – professional baseball right fielder for the New York Mets
- Ras-I Dowling – New England Patriots cornerback 2011–present
- Deon Dyer – Miami Dolphins running back 2003–2004
- Kenny Easley (b. 1959) – professional football player with the Seattle Seahawks and Pro-Football Hall of Fame Member
- DeAngelo Hall (b. 1983) – professional football cornerback for the Washington Redskins
- Grant Holloway (b. 1997) – from Chesapeake (Grassfield High School) and University of Florida; won silver in the 2020 Olympics
- The Last Bison – indie folk group
- Ashton Lewis (b. 1972) – NASCAR driver
- Bruce McDonald – professor and editor
- Alonzo Mourning (b. 1970) – professional basketball player for the Miami Heat
- Darren Perry (b. 1968) – football player with the Pittsburgh Steelers
- Jay Pharoah (b. 1987) – actor, comedian, cast member of Saturday Night Live
- Chris Richardson (b. 1984) – American Idol season 5 top 5 finalist
- Ricky Rudd (b. 1956) – professional NASCAR race car driver
- Josh Rupe (b. 1982) – professional baseball pitcher for the Texas Rangers
- Elton Sawyer (b. 1959) – NASCAR driver
- Donald Spitz – controversial Christian anti-abortion activist
- Eric Stanley (b. 1991) – violinist and composer
- Darryl Tapp – Seattle Seahawks player and 63rd pick overall in the 2006 NFL draft
- B. J. Upton (b. 1984) – professional baseball shortstop for the Tampa Bay Rays; drafted #2 overall in 2002
- Justin Upton (b. 1987) – professional baseball player drafted #1 overall in 2005 by the Arizona Diamondbacks
- Adrienne Warren (b. 1987) – professional singer, actress and dancer; portrayed Lorrell Robinson in the 2010 national tour of Dreamgirls; singer for Trans-Siberian Orchestra
- David Wright (b. 1982) – professional baseball starting third baseman for the New York Mets
- Ava Max – singer and songwriter

== Hampton ==
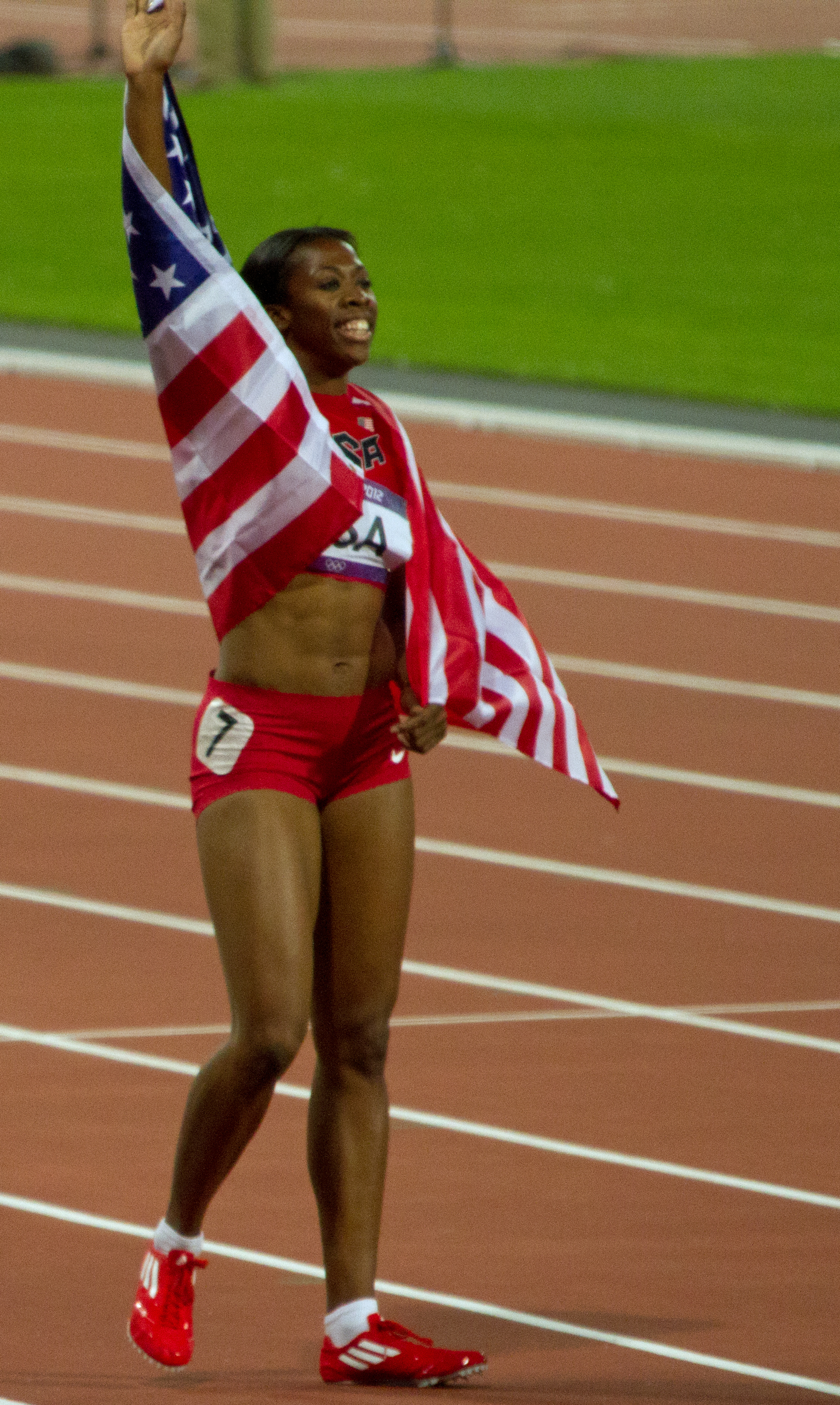
Francena McCorory

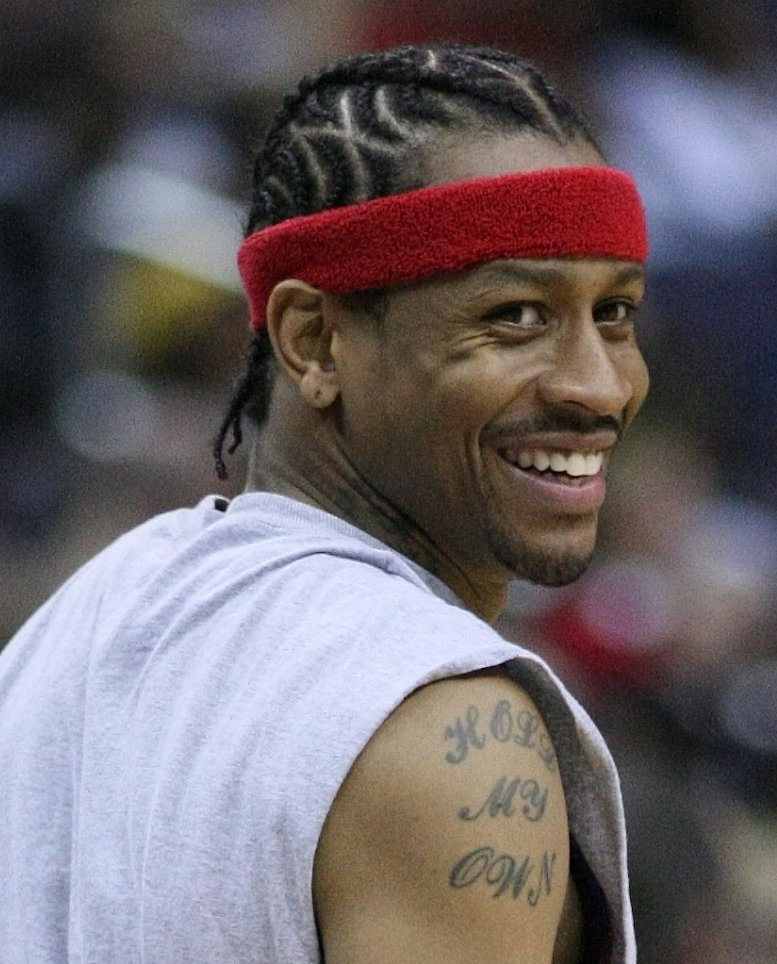
Allen Iverson

- Jeremiah Owusu-Koramoah (b. 1999) - linebacker with the Cleveland Browns
- Xavier Adibi – linebacker with the Houston Texans
- Robert Banks – NFL defensive end
- Macey Brooks – wide receiver for the Dallas Cowboys and Chicago Bears
- Elton Brown (b. 1982) – former professional football player for the Arizona Cardinals
- Ronald Curry (b. 1979) – professional football player for the Oakland Raiders
- DRAM (b. 1988) – musician
- Chris Durkin (b. 2000) – soccer player
- Steve Earle (b. 1955) – popular country-rock musician and songwriter
- Chris Ellis – practice team member for the Pittsburgh Steelers
- La'Keshia Frett – professional basketball player and coach
- Shaun Gayle (b. 1962) – professional football player with the San Diego Chargers
- Chris Hanburger (b. 1941) – popular Washington Redskins player in the 1970s
- Dwight Hollier (b. 1969) – professional football player with the Miami Dolphins and the Indianapolis Colts
- Mike Husted (b. 1970) – former kicker for the Tampa Bay Buccaneers, Oakland Raiders, and Washington Redskins
- Weldon Irvine (1943–2002) – musician
- Allen Iverson (b. 1975) – former professional basketball player
- John P. Jumper (b. 1945) – former chief of staff of the US Air Force
- Todd Kelly (b. 1970) – professional football player for the San Francisco 49ers, Cincinnati Bengals, and Atlanta Falcons
- Jerod Mayo (b. 1986) – professional football player with the New England Patriots drafted 10th overall in 2008
- Francena McCorory (b. 1988) – member of 2012 gold medal Olympic women's 4x400 team
- Dwight Stephenson (b. 1957) – professional football player for the Miami Dolphins and member of the Pro Football Hall of Fame
- Tyrod Taylor (b.1989) – NFL quarterback for the New York Giants
- Dwight White (1949–2008) – defensive end on the Pittsburgh Steelers during their 1970s glory years
- Jimmy F. Williams (b. 1984) – professional football player with the Atlanta Falcons
- Steve Wilson – jazz musician, alto and soprano saxophones, flute; composer
- Antwoine Womack – drafted by New England Patriots in 2002
- Roy "Future Man" Wooten (b. 1957) – musician

== Newport News ==
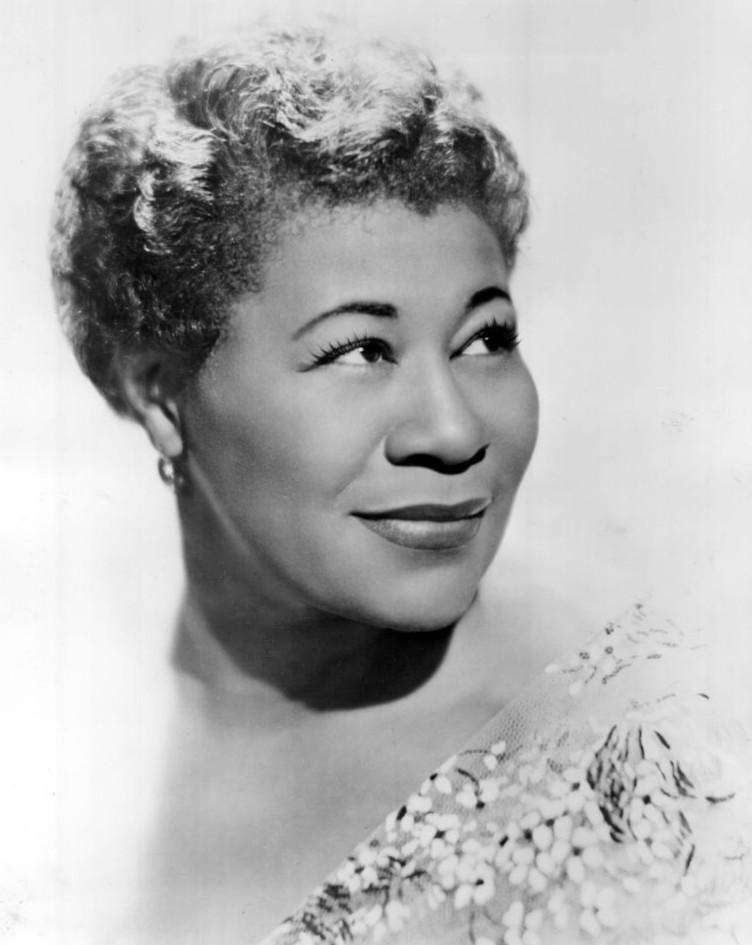
Ella Fitzgerald

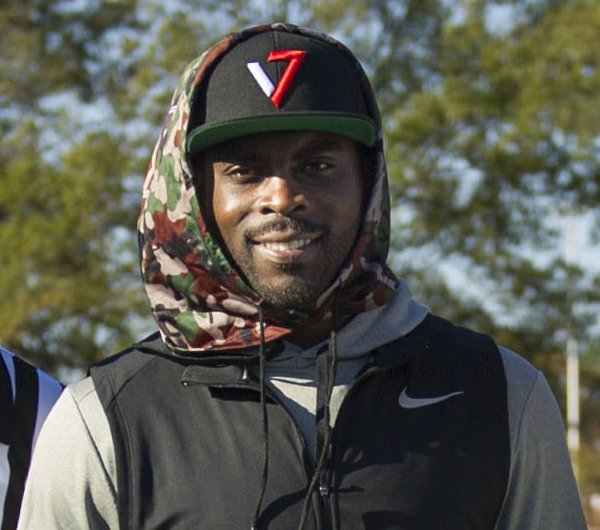
Michael Vick

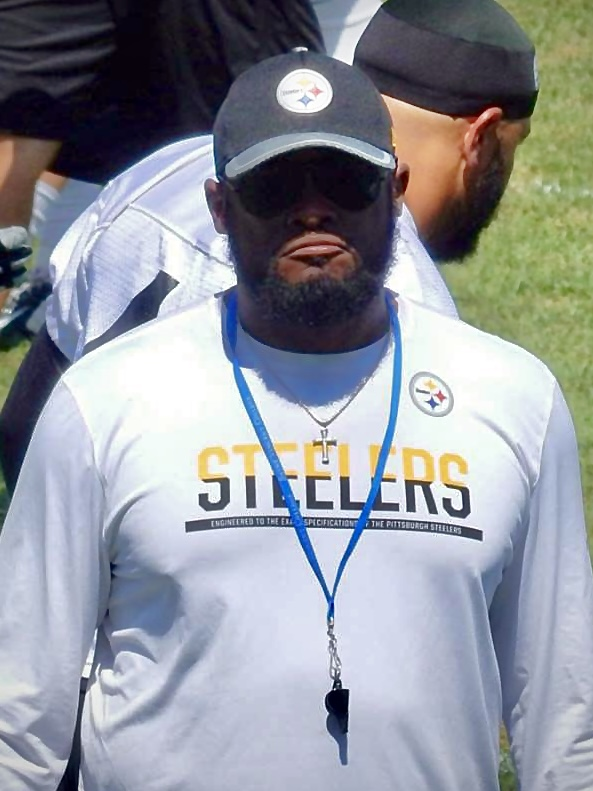
Mike Tomlin

- Willie Armstead (b. 1952) – former professional football player in the Canadian Football League
- Keith Atherton (b. 1959) – former pitcher for the Minnesota Twins and the Oakland Athletics
- Pearl Bailey (1918–1990) – Tony Award-winning actress and singer
- Antoine Bethea (b. 1984) – professional football strong safety for the San Francisco 49ers
- Larry Bethea (1956–1987) – late professional football player for the Dallas Cowboys
- Darryl Blackstock (b. 1983) – professional football player for the Cincinnati Bengals
- Blind Blake (1896–1934) – blues and ragtime musician (not officially confirmed he was born in Newport News)
- Robert Eugene Brashers (1958–1999), serial killer
- Aaron Brooks (b. 1976) – former professional football quarterback for the Oakland Raiders; land developer
- Joyce Bulifant (b. 1937) – television actress
- Robert Cray (b. 1953) – blues guitarist
- Will Crutchfield (b. 1957) – opera conductor
- Scott Darling (b. 1988) – professional ice hockey goaltender for the Carolina Hurricanes
- Ben Edwards (b. 1992) – football player
- Frankie Faison (b. 1949) – film actor
- Ella Fitzgerald (1917–1996) – jazz singer
- The Five Keys – popular soul and doo-wop act in the 1950s; featuring Newport News locals Ripley Ingram, Bernie West, Dickie Threat and Rudy West
- Earl R. Fox (1919–2012) – U.S. Navy and Coast Guard veteran; last American active servicemember from World War II
- Johnny Gilbert (b. 1928) – announcer for the television quiz show Jeopardy!
- Marques Hagans (b. 1982) – NFL player
- Debbie Horton – guitarist, DJ and songwriter
- Henry Jordan (1935–1977) – former professional football player for the Green Bay Packers; member of the Pro Football Hall of Fame
- Richard Kelly (b. 1975) – film director and writer; films include Donnie Darko and Domino
- Leroy Keyes (1947–2021) – professional football running back for the Philadelphia Eagles
- J. J. Lankes (1884–1960) – woodcut artist, lived for many years in the Hilton Village neighborhood
- Kwamie Lassiter (1969-2019) – former football safety for the Arizona Cardinals
- David Macklin (b. 1978) – professional football player for the Washington Redskins
- Michael Maguire (b. 1955) – Tony Award-winning actor
- Queen Esther Marrow (b. 1941) – soul and gospel singer
- Masego (b. 1993) – R&B and traphouse jazz artist
- Lightfoot Solomon Michaux (1885–1969) – evangelist, early radio and television pioneer
- J. Clyde Morris (1909–1987) – first executive director of the Chesapeake Bay Bridge–Tunnel; former city manager of the City of Warwick
- Hazel R. O'Leary (b. 1937) – former Secretary of Energy under President Bill Clinton and president of Fisk University
- Tommy Reamon (b. 1952) – former pro football player and coach
- Austin Roberts (b. 1945) – singer and songwriter
- Shirley H. Scheibla (1919–2000)) – journalist and author
- Norm Snead (1939–2024) – former professional football quarterback for the Philadelphia Eagles
- Sonja Sohn (b. 1964) – actress, The Wire, Body of Proof
- Jon St. John (b. 1960) – voice actor and singer, best known as the voice of Duke Nukem
- Bobby Scott (b. 1947) – U.S. representative, former Virginia state senator and Virginia state delegate
- William Styron (1925–2006) – author of The Confessions of Nat Turner and Sophie's Choice
- Nick "The Goat" Thompson (b. 1981) – professional mixed martial arts fighter; Bodog Fight Welterweight Champion
- Mike Tomlin (b. 1972) – head coach of the Pittsburgh Steelers
- Al Toon (b. 1963) – former professional football player for the New York Jets
- Marcus Vick (b. 1984) – former NFL player, quarterback for Virginia Tech
- Michael Vick (b. 1980) – NFL quarterback, Philadelphia Eagles
- Victor Wooten (b. 1964) – musician
- Trinity Tatum (b. 2003) - winner of Love Island USA season 8

== Norfolk ==
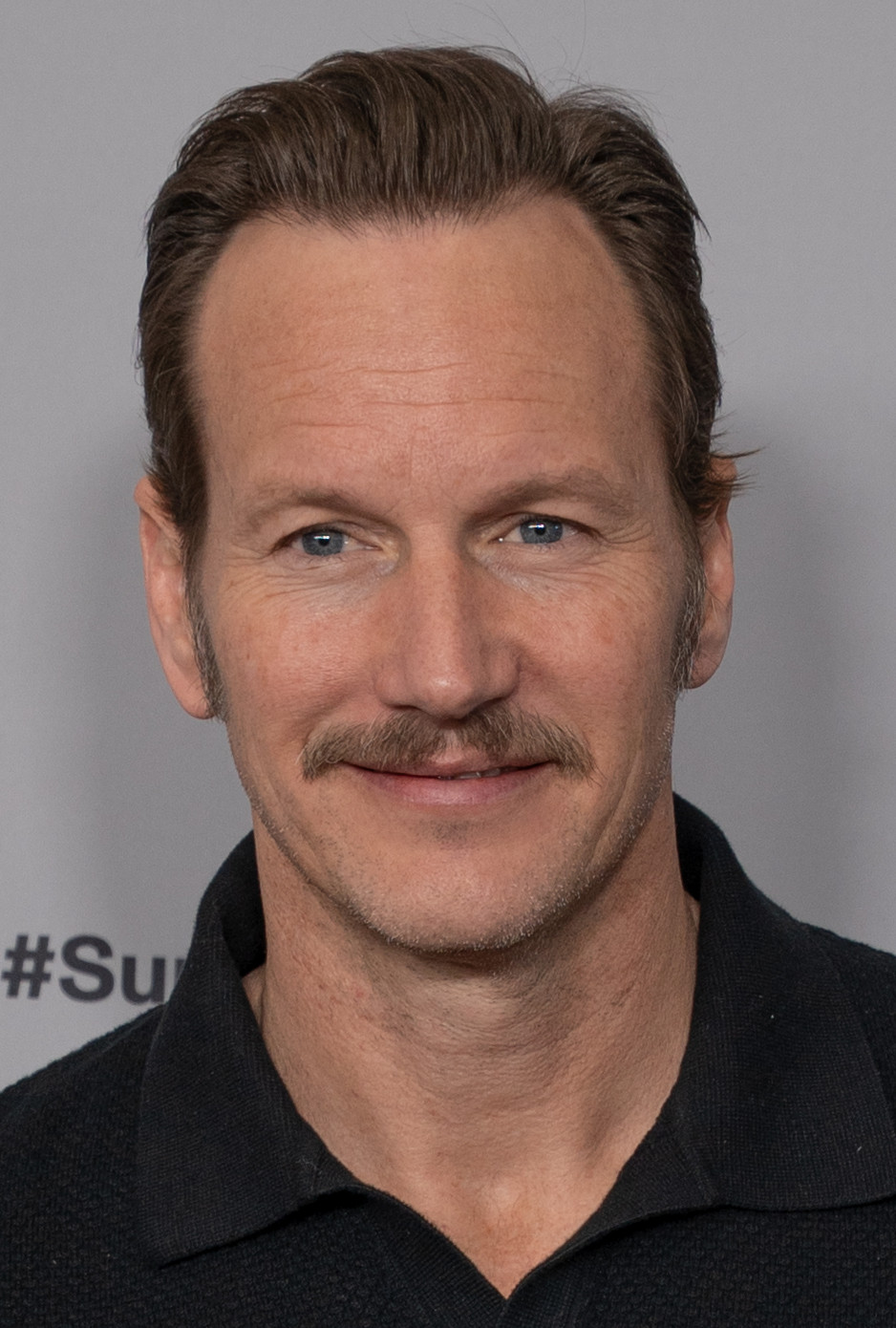
Patrick Wilson

- Adam Anderson – driver of the Taz and Grave Digger Monster Trucks; son of Monster Truck driver
- Dennis Anderson – driver of the Grave Digger Monster Truck in the Monster Jam series
- Mason Andrews (1919–2006) – physician who delivered America's first in vitro baby; visionary leader of Norfolk's late 20th century renaissance
- Anhayla (b. 1988) – singer-songwriter
- Gordon Banks (b. 1955) – guitarist and music director for Marvin Gaye
- Al Barks (1936–2018) – Negro league baseball player
- Gary "U.S." Bonds (b. 1939) – singer-songwriter
- Plaxico Burress (b. 1977) – professional football wide receiver for the New York Jets
- William Harvey Carney (1840–1908) – African-American soldier of the American Civil War; Medal of Honor recipient for his part in the 54th Massachusetts Infantry's assault on Fort Wagner, South Carolina
- Kam Chancellor (b. 1988) – professional football safety for the Seattle Seahawks
- Clarence Clemons – saxophonist for Bruce Springsteen's E Street Band
- Alex Cosmidis – Minor League baseball player and manager and Major League scout
- William Couper (1853–1942) – sculptor
- Colgate Whitehead Darden, Jr. (1897–1981) – U.S. representative; governor of Virginia; chancellor of the College of William and Mary; third president of the University of Virginia
- Keyshawn Davis (b. 1999) – professional boxer
- Mike D'Orso (b. 1953) – author, journalist
- Charles "Lefty" Driesell (1931–2024) – basketball coach at Davidson College, the University of Maryland, College Park, James Madison University, and Georgia State University
- Rob Estes (b. 1963) – actor
- Ryan Farish (b. 1974) – music composer, artist, publisher, and record executive of Rytone Entertainment
- Florian-Ayala Fauna – artist musician
- Hank Foiles – from Norfolk, Major league All-Star in 1957; played for seven teams; finished his career in 1964 with the expansion Los Angeles Angels
- William Fuller (b. 1962) – professional football defensive end for the Houston Oilers, Philadelphia Eagles and Chicago Bears
- Stephen Furst (1954–2017) – television actor
- Grant Gustin (b. 1990) – television actor
- Henry Howell (1920–1997) – Independent lieutenant governor of Virginia
- Lawrence "LoJo" Johnson (b. 1974) – Olympic pole vaulter, silver medalist in 2000
- General Norman Johnson (1943-2010) – R&B musician
- Kishi Bashi (b. 1975) – indie rock violinist; solo musician; tour member of Of Montreal and Regina Spektor
- Naomi Long Madgett (1923–2020) – poet
- Mae – indie rock band
- Magnum T. A. - former professional wrestler
- Thomas W. Moss, Jr. (1928–2015) – Democratic Speaker of the Virginia House of Delegates, 1992–2000
- Wayne Newton (b. 1942) – aka "Mr. Las Vegas"; singer and songwriter
- Tim Reid (b. 1944) – television actor, director, and film executive
- Jodi Rell (b. 1946) – Republican governor of Connecticut, 2004–2011
- Joseph Jenkins Roberts (1809–1876) – first president of Liberia
- Dave Robertson (1889–1970) – from Norfolk, two-time National League home run leader; hit .500 in 1917 World Series; hit .287 over nine seasons with the Giants, Cubs and Pirates; product of Norfolk Academy; played four sports at Wake Forest and NC State; managed the minor league Norfolk Tars for several years in the 1920s
- Larry Sabato (b. 1952) – political pundit and professor at the University of Virginia
- Ed Schultz (1954–2018) – pundit and TV personality for MSNBC
- Deborah Shelton (b. 1948) – actress; Miss USA 1970, first runner-up in Miss Universe contest
- John Wesley Shipp (b. 1956) – television actor
- Bruce Smith (b. 1963) – Pro Football Hall of Fame player for the Buffalo Bills and Washington Redskins
- Joe Smith (b. 1975) – professional basketball player for the Philadelphia 76ers
- Keely Smith (1928–2017) – nightclub singer, wife and stage partner of Louis Prima
- Margaret Sullavan (1909–1960) – actress and wife of Leland Hayward
- Chuck Swirsky – Chicago Bulls radio play-by-play announcer, previously with Toronto Raptors
- Littleton Waller Tazewell (1774–1860) – U.S. representative, U.S. senator and governor of Virginia
- Antoine Thompson – cornerback with the St. Louis Rams
- Scott Travis (b. 1961) – drummer for rock band Judas Priest
- John Paul Vann (1924–1972) – U.S. soldier and civilian active in Vietnam
- Marc Vann (b. 1954) – actor
- Brandon Vera (b. 1977) – mixed martial artist, currently signed to UFC
- Gene Vincent (1935–1971) – rock-a-billy artist recorded the hit "Be-Bop-a-Lula"
- Ben Watson (b. 1980) – football player for the New England Patriots
- Ernie Watts (b. 1945) – composer, jazz saxophonist, and long-time touring member of The Rolling Stones
- Joe Weatherly (1922–1964) – NASCAR driver
- Pernell "Sweet Pea" Whitaker (b. 1964) – boxer; 1984 Olympic gold medalist, professional champion in four weight classes
- Thomas Wilkins (b. 1954) – orchestra conductor, music director of the Omaha Symphony Orchestra
- Patrick Wilson (b. 1973) – actor
- David Wright (b. 1982) – professional baseball player for the New York Mets

== Portsmouth ==
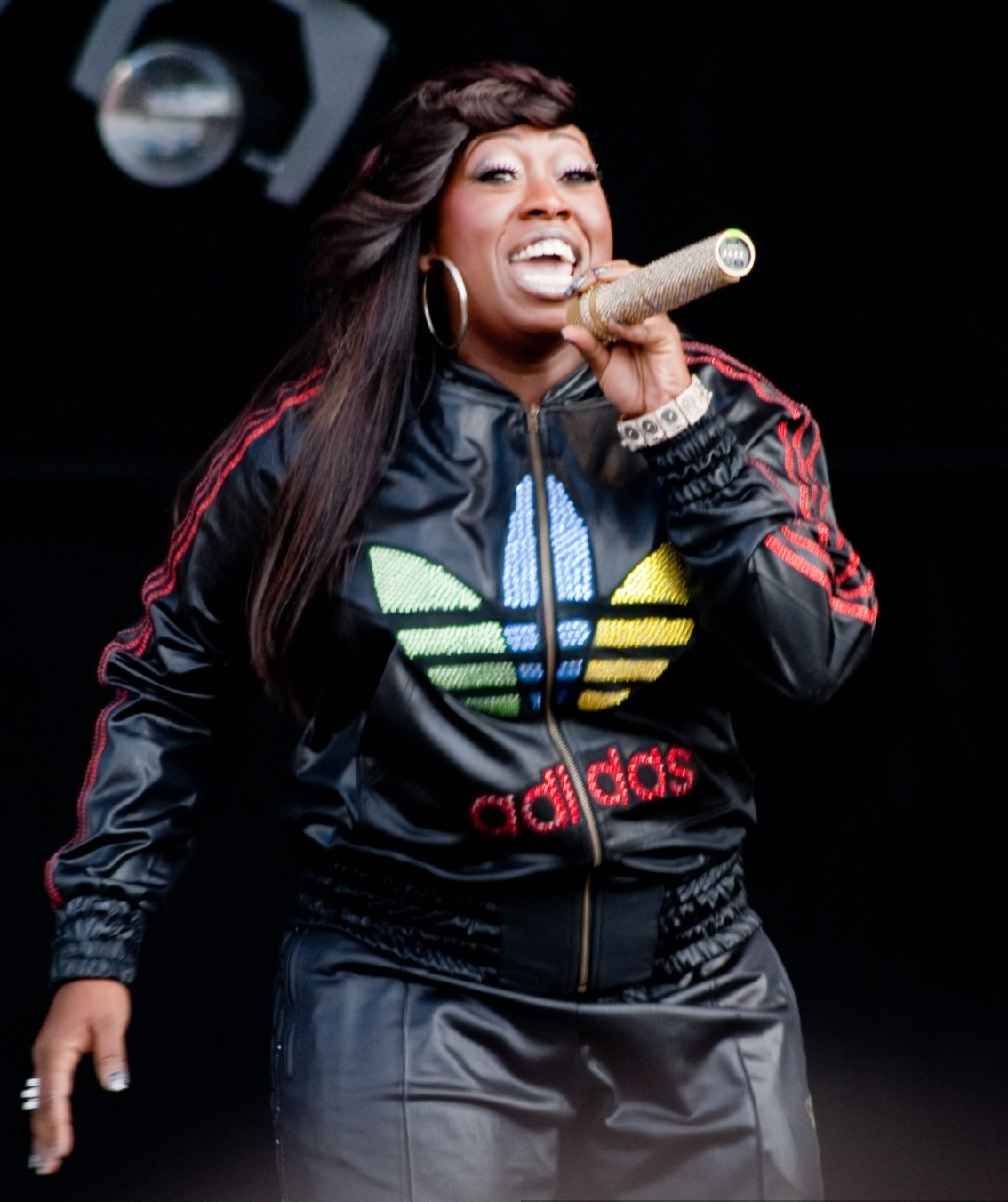
Missy Elliott

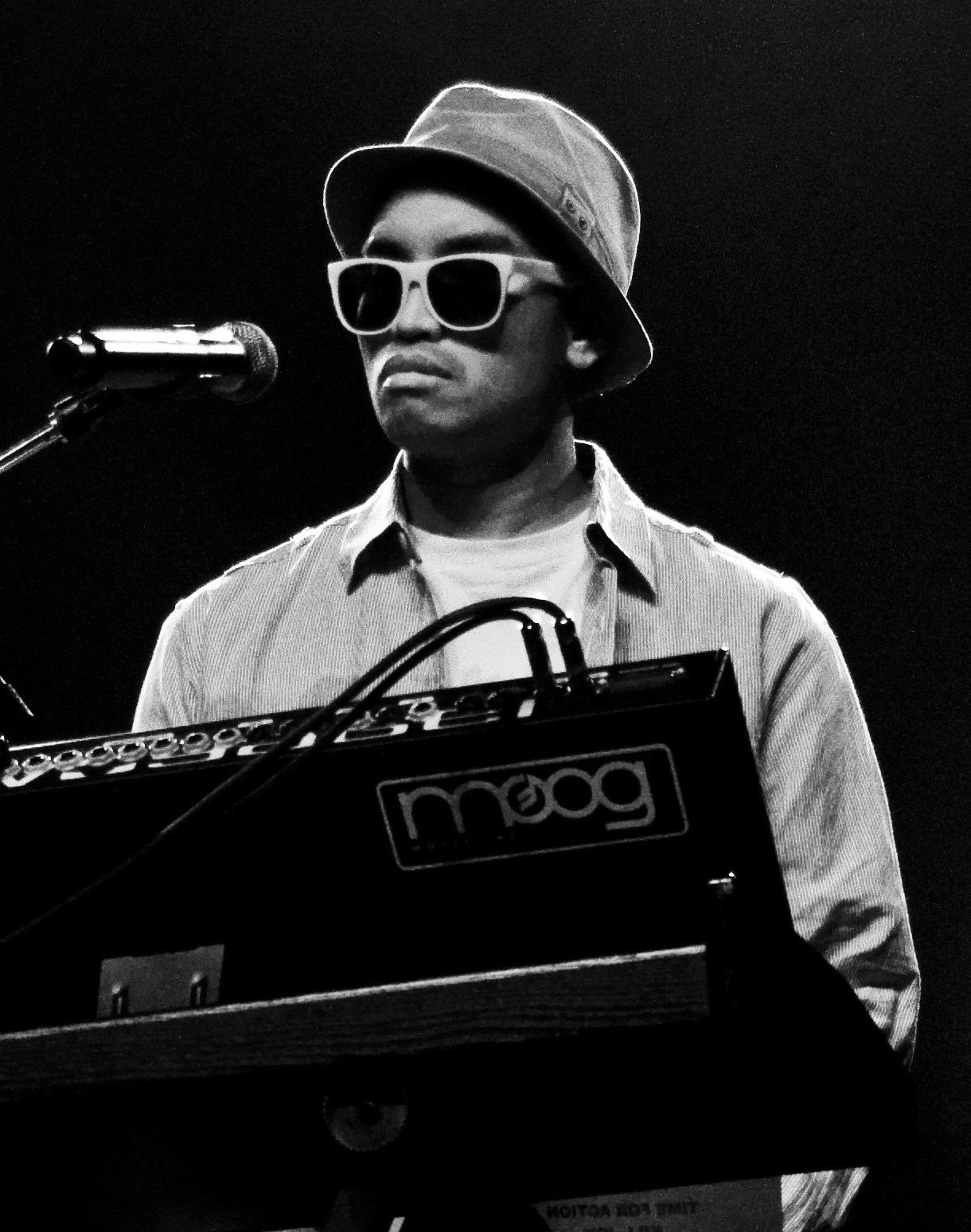
Chad Hugo

- V. C. Andrews (1923–1986) – mystery and horror writer
- Cleo Anthony (b. 1981) – actor
- James P. Berkeley (1907–1985) – USMC general and expert in military communications
- Ken Bowersox (b. 1956) – astronaut
- Marty Brennaman (b. 1942) – sportscaster for the Cincinnati Reds
- Karen Briggs (b. 1963) – violinist
- Ruth Brown (1928–2006) – Grammy Award-winning singer and entertainer
- Bebe Buell (b. 1953) – fashion model, famous groupie and mother of Liv Tyler
- John T. Casteen III (b. 1943) – president of the University of Virginia, born in Portsmouth
- Mahlon Clark (1923–2007) – musician
- LaTasha Colander (b. 1976) – track and field sprint star, 2000 Olympic gold medalist (4 × 400 m)
- Deborah Coleman (1956–2018) – blues musician
- Fanny Murdaugh Downing (1831–1894) – author and poet
- Archie Elliott Jr. – retired judge and lawyer
- Archie Elliott III (1968–1993) – Black 24-year-old shot by police in District Heights, Maryland on June 18, 1993
- Jamin Elliott (b. 1979) – former NFL wide receiver for the Chicago Bears, New England Patriots and Atlanta Falcons
- Missy Elliott (b. 1971) – rapper
- Perry Ellis (1940–1986) – fashion designer
- John Facenda (1913–1984) – WCAU news anchor from 1948 to 1973; known as the "voice of NFL Films" until his death in 1984
- Dorian Finney-Smith – basketball player for the University of Florida and Dallas Mavericks
- Clifton C. Garvin (1921–2016) – president and CEO of Exxon
- Mordechai Gifter (1915–2001) – among the foremost American religious leaders of Orthodox Jewry in the late 20th century
- Melvin Gregg (1988–) – actor and model
- Chandler Harper (1914–2004) – golfer
- Ken Hatfield – classical guitarist
- James W. Holley III (1926–2012) – politician, first African-American mayor of any city in the Hampton Roads region (Portsmouth)
- W. Nathaniel "Nat" Howell (1939–2020) – State Dept. foreign service officer, former ambassador to Kuwait; professor emeritus, the University of Virginia
- Chad Hugo (b. 1974) – musician and producer in the Neptunes and N.E.R.D.
- Ben L. Jones (b. 1941) – actor and politician
- T. J. Jordan (b. 1986) – basketball player
- Jillian Kesner-Graver (1949–2007) – actress
- Jack T. Kirby (1938–2009) – historian of the southern United States, awarded the Bancroft Prize for his 2006 book Mockingbird Song: Ecological Landscapes of the South
- Erik S. Kristensen (1972–2005) – US Navy SEAL lieutenant commander and highest decorated SEAL to be killed in Operation Red Wings
- Rita Lavelle (b. 1947) – assistant administrator of the U.S. Environmental Protection Agency
- Louise Lucas (b. 1944) – Virginia state senator;first woman and first African-American to hold the position of president pro tempore of the Virginia Senate
- Nathan McCall (1955–) – author who grew up in the Cavalier Manor section of Portsmouth, Virginia
- Kenneth R. Melvin (b. 1952) – former member of the Virginia House of Delegates, lawyer, and current jurist for the Third Circuit of Virginia
- LaShawn Merritt (b. 1986) – 2008 Olympic gold medal-winning sprinter
- Pete Mikolajewski (b. 1943) – football player
- Johnny E. Morrison – jurist for the Third Circuit of Virginia
- George "Shadow" Morton (1941–2013) – record producer and songwriter
- James Murphy (1967–) – metal guitarist, member of the bands Death, Testament, Obituary and Disincarnate
- Bismarck Myrick (b. 1940) – U.S. ambassador to the Republic of Liberia, U.S. ambassador to Lesotho
- Wendell Cushing Neville (1870–1930) – 14th Commandant of the U.S. Marine Corps
- Tommy Newsom (1929–2007) – musician featured in Johnny Carson's The Tonight Show band with Doc Severinsen
- Patton Oswalt (b. 1969) – comedian and television actor
- Ace Parker (1912–2013) – Pro Football Hall of Fame quarterback; also played baseball with the Philadelphia Athletics
- John L. Porter (1813–1893) – president of the first city council, a naval constructor for United States Navy and the Confederate States Navy
- Dave Robertson (1889–1970), MLB outfielder 1912–22, played in World Series for New York Giants; born in Portsmouth
- William Russ (b. 1950) – actor
- Bill Schneider (b. 1944) – political commentator for CNN
- Don Scott (b. 1965) – lawyer, Democratic politician, Navy veteran, and the first Black Speaker of the Virginia House of Delegates
- Dave Smith (1942–) – poet, novelist
- Lon Solomon – Christian pastor and evangelist
- Dorin Spivey – NBA World and NABA Lightweight Boxing Champion
- William Spong Jr. (1920–1997) – lawyer, Democratic politician, United States Senator for the state of Virginia
- Brenda Spry – jurist for the Third Circuit of Virginia
- Wanda Sykes (b. 1964) – actress, comedian, and comedy writer
- Ted Thomas, Sr. (1935–2020) – Pentecostal preacher and pastor of the New Community Temple Church of God in Christ; General board member of the Church of God in Christ, Inc. denomination
- Clif Tinker (1956–) – San Antonio, Texas-based commercial artist
- Adrienne Warren (1987–) – Broadway singer and actress
- Mike Watt (b. 1957) – musician, founding member and bassist of SST hardcore punk band Minutemen; current bassist for recently reunited 60s band The Stooges
- Khadijah Whittington (1986–) – professional basketball player for the CSM Satu Mare of the Liga Națională
- Nicole Wray (b. 1980) – rapper and protégé of Missy Elliott

== Suffolk ==
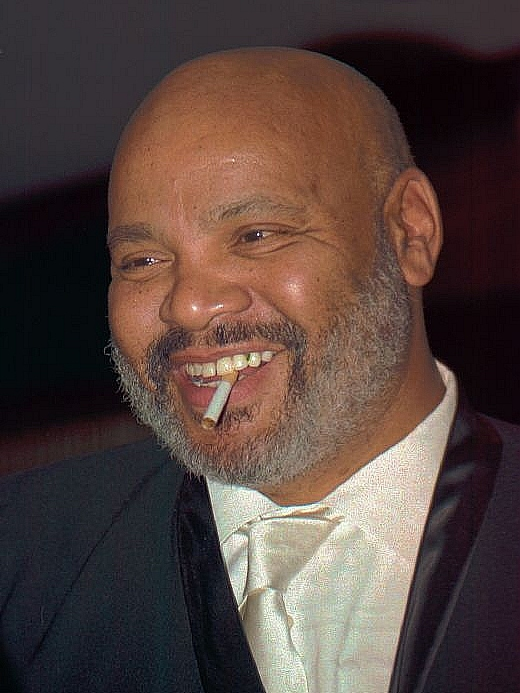
James Avery

- James Avery (1955–2013) – actor best known for his portrayal of Philip Banks on the sitcom The Fresh Prince of Bel-Air
- Johnnie Barnes (b. 1968) – graduate of Hampton University; former football player for the San Diego Chargers and the Pittsburgh Steelers
- Charlie Byrd (1925–1999) – jazz guitarist
- Mills Edwin Godwin, Jr. (1914–1999) – two-time governor of Virginia
- Joe S. Lawrie (1914–2009) – U.S. Army major general
- Brandon Lowe (b. 1994) – Major League Baseball player
- Lex Luger (b. 1991) – hip-hop music producer; produced tracks on Rick Ross's Teflon Don, Waka Flocka Flame's Flockaveli, Slim Thug's Tha Thug Show, and Kanye West and Jay-Z's Watch the Throne
- Joe Maphis (1921–1986) – country music singer and songwriter
- Terrence Warren (b. 1969) – former NFL player and All-American sprinter at Hampton University

== Virginia Beach ==
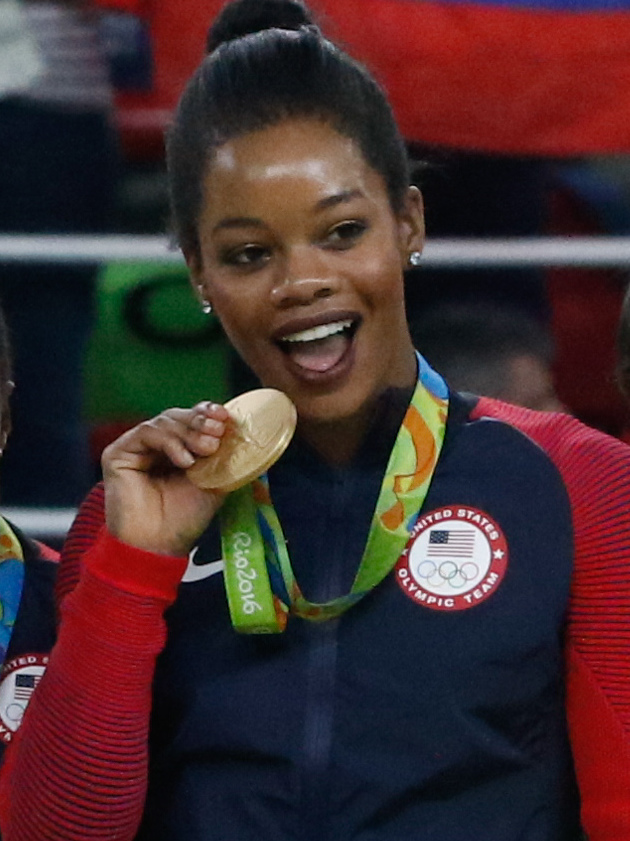
Gabby Douglas

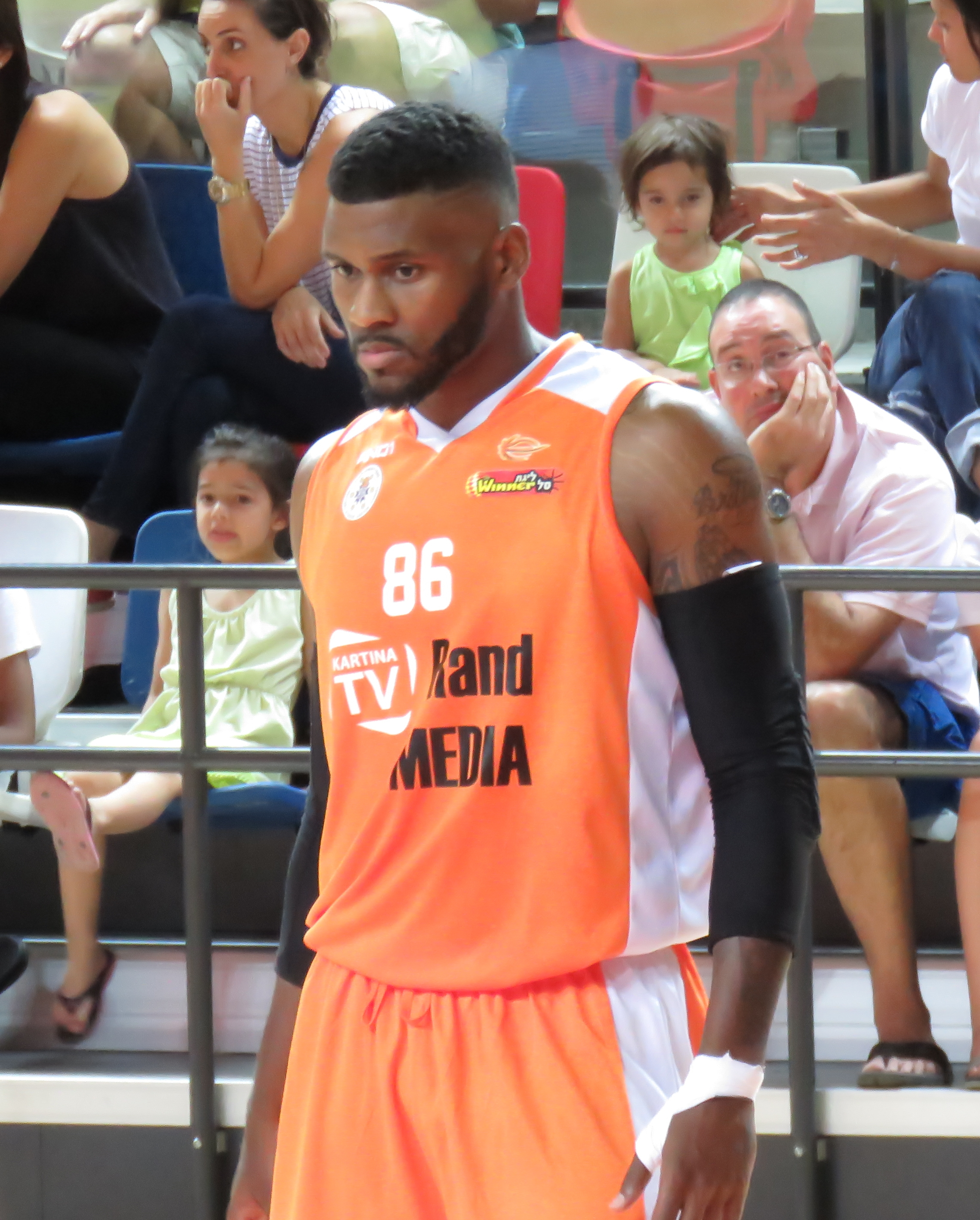
Darryl Monroe

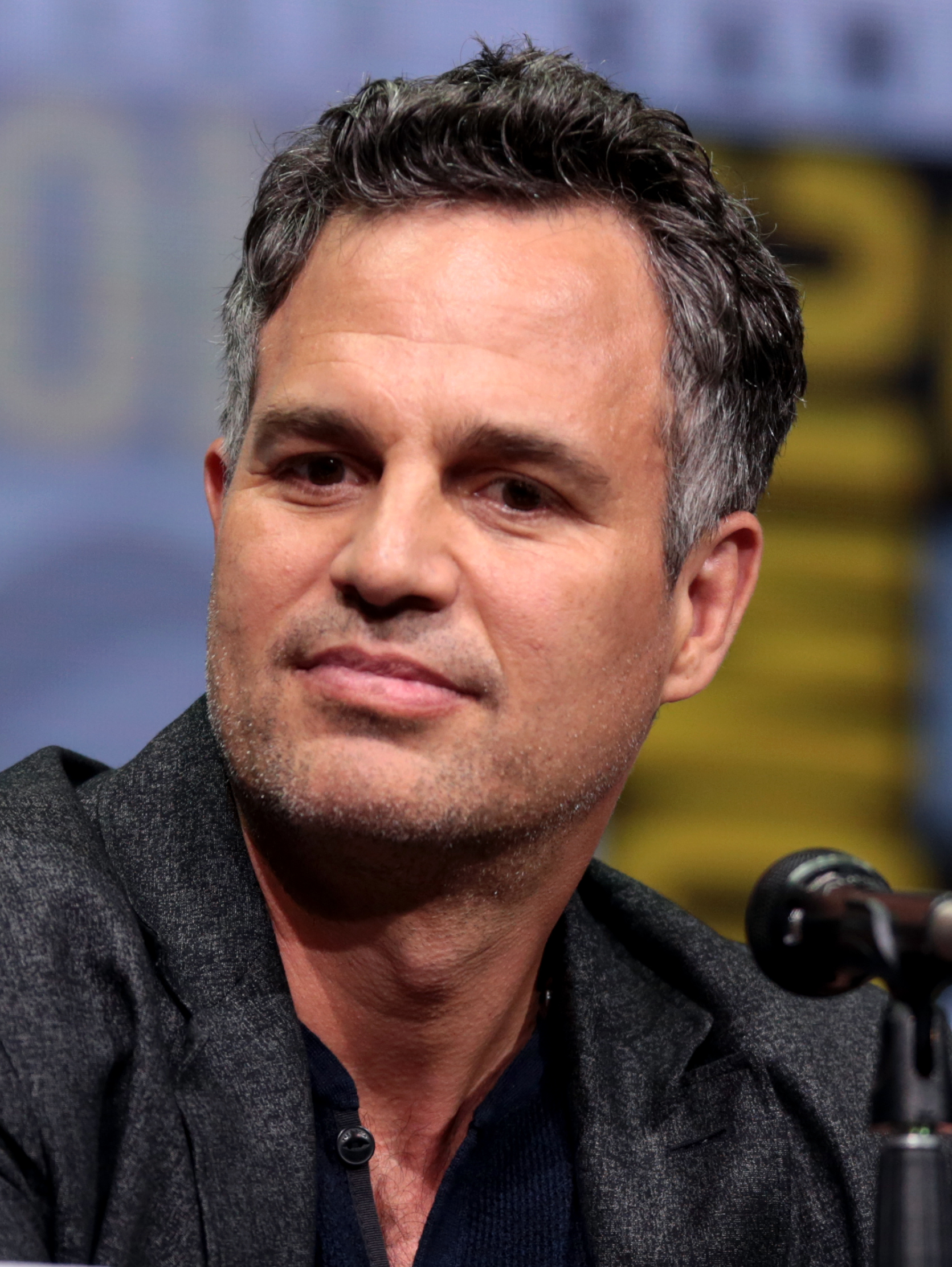
Mark Ruffalo

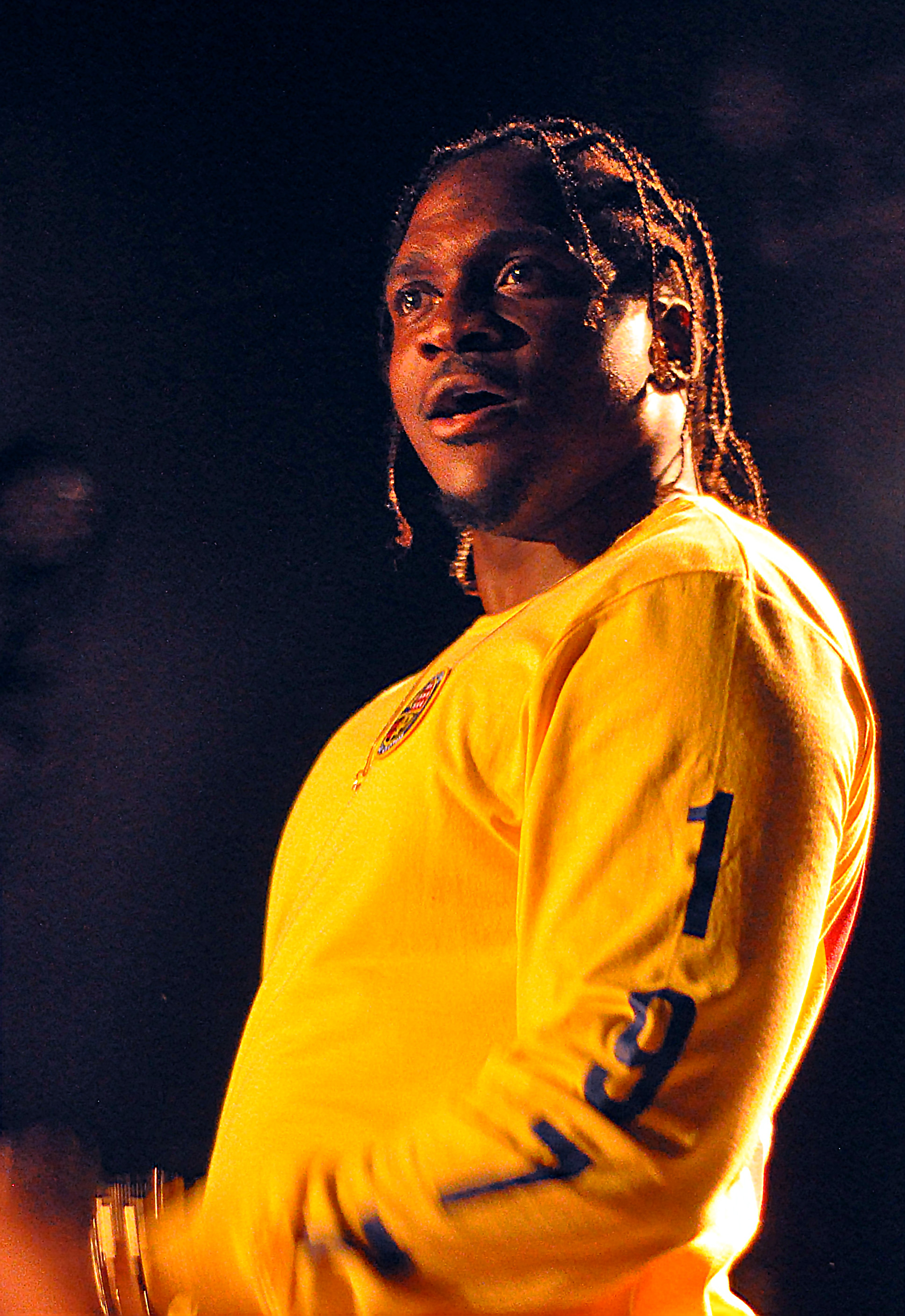
Pusha T

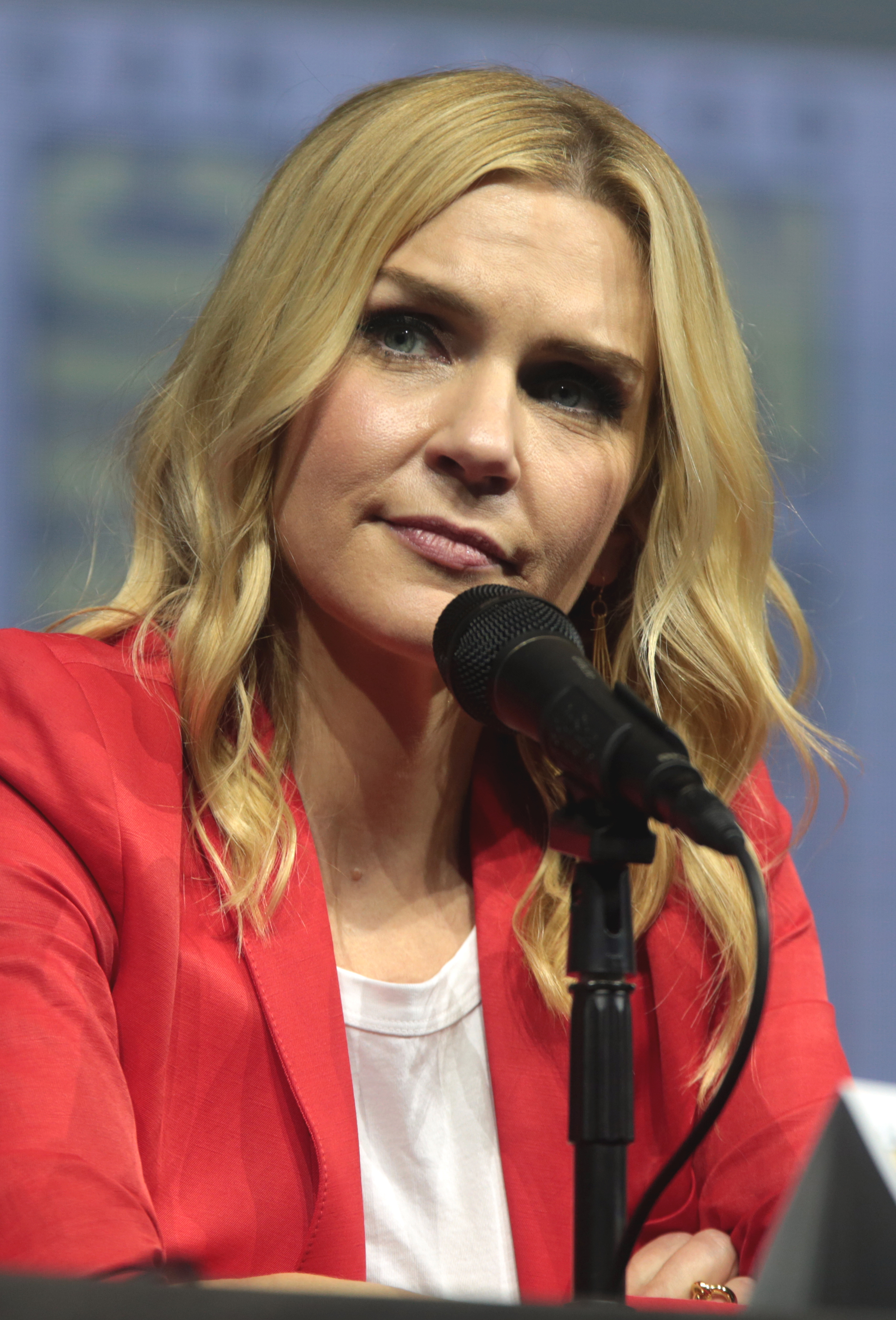
Rhea Seehorn

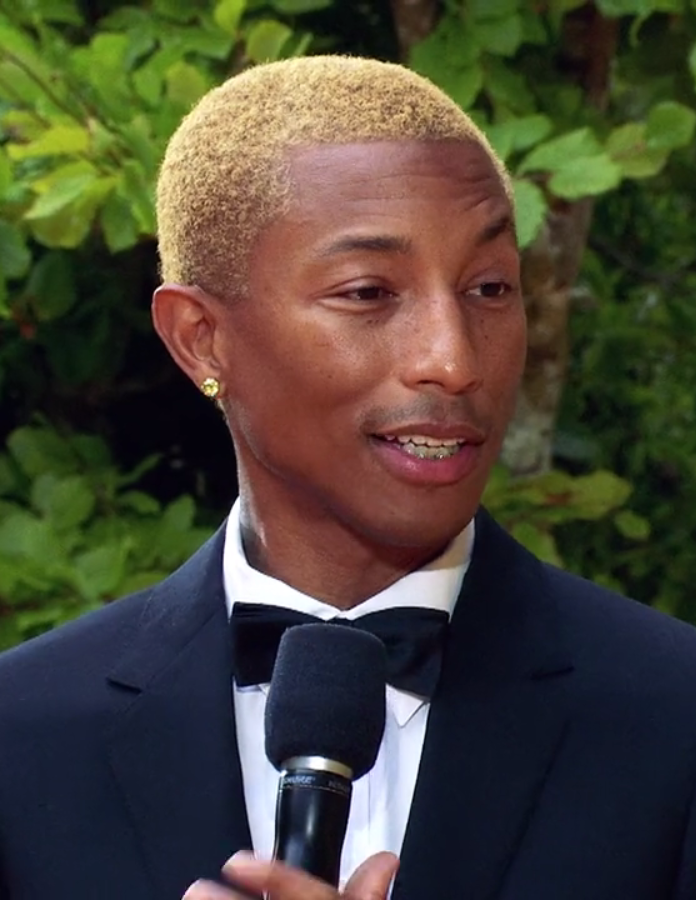
Pharrell Williams

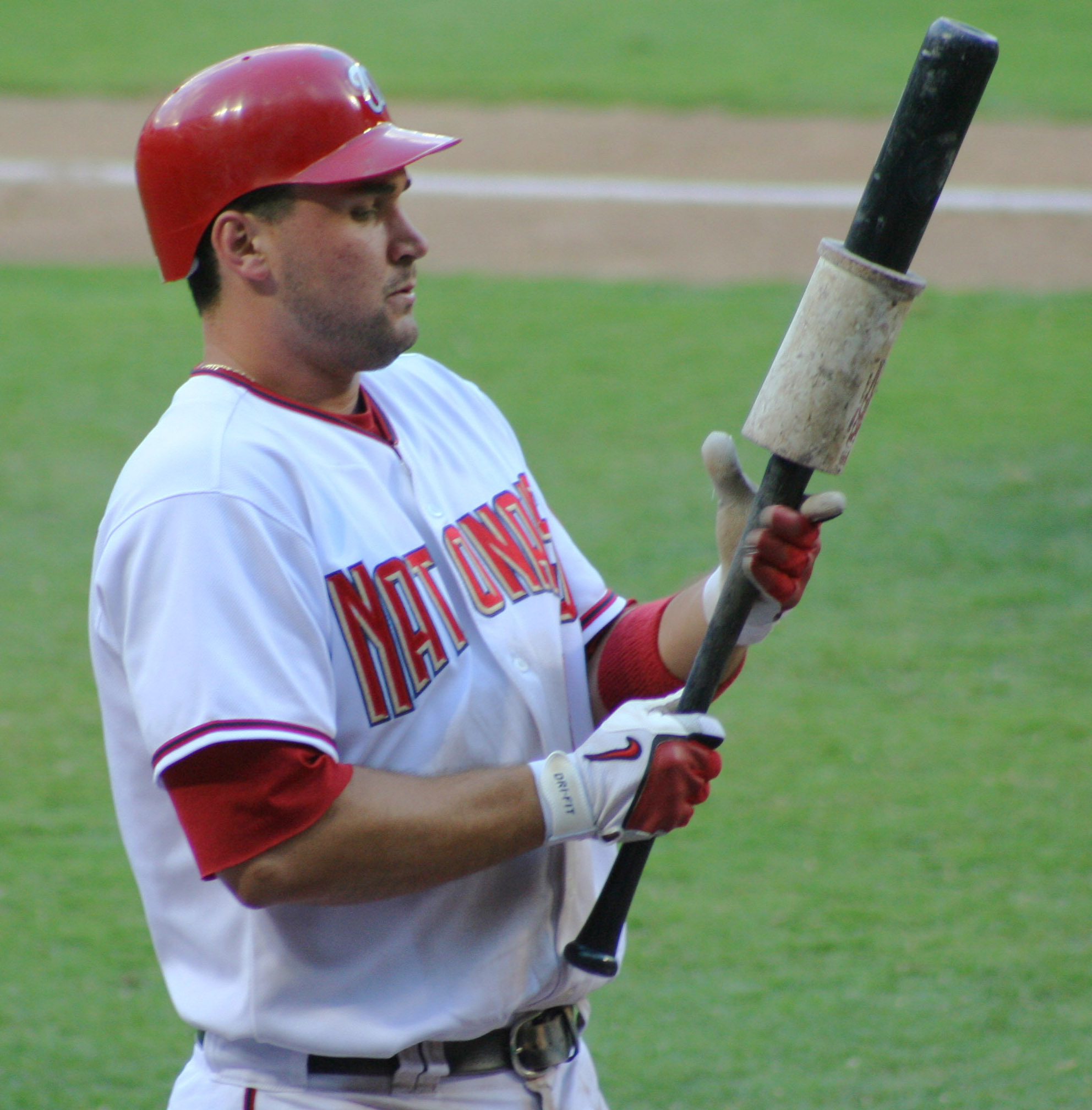
Ryan Zimmerman

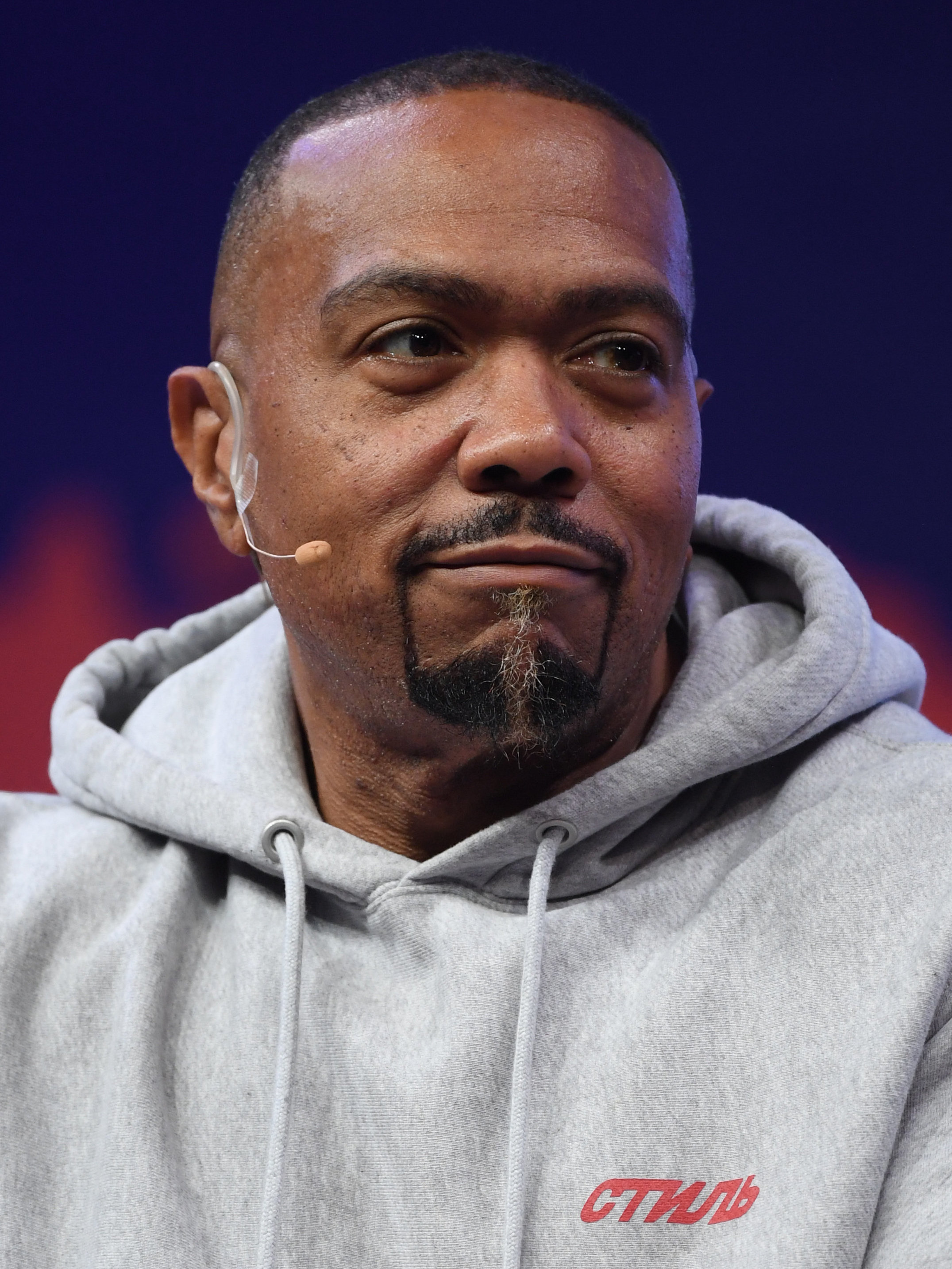
Timbaland

- Corey Ashe (b. 1986) – soccer player
- Clara Byrd Baker, (1886-1979) – educator
- Adam Ballou (b. 1992) – cerebral palsy soccer player and Paralympian
- Wade Barrett (b. 1976) – soccer player
- Felicia Barton (b. 1982) – semi-finalist on American Idol
- Malachi Barton (b. 2007) – actor, son of Felicia Barton
- Kharlton Belmar (b. 1992) – soccer player
- Kelli Barrett, actress
- Gina Bennett – CIA analyst and writer
- Eric Bird (b. 1993) – soccer player
- Rudy Boesch (1928–2019) – retired Navy SEAL and contestant on Survivor
- Jamelle Bouie (b. 1987) – journalist, New York Times columnist, and political analyst
- Bill Bray (b. 1983) – MLB player
- Travis Brent (b. 1992) – soccer player and coach
- Plaxico Burress - NFL Player
- Jon Busch (b. 1976) – Hampton Roads Mariner; Major League Soccer
- Curtis Bush (b. 1962) – kickboxer
- Rebecca Cardon, actress, personal trainer and spokesperson
- Gabby Douglas (b. 1995) – Olympic gymnastics gold medalist
- D.J. Dozier (b. 1965) – football / baseball from Virginia Beach; Penn State All-American, first-round NFL draft 14th pick by Minnesota Vikings who was also drafted by major league baseball by the Detroit Tigers in the 18th round in 1983 (459th overall)
- Jason Dubois (b. 1979) – MLB player
- Genesis the Greykid (real name Russell McGee Jr.) – artist, creative, poet, writer
- Percy Harvin (b. 1988) – NFL player
- Devon Hall, played college basketball for the Virginia Cavaliers, professional basketball player for Fenerbahçe Istanbul of the Basketbol Süper Ligi
- Michael Hearst (b. 1972) – author, musician, and composer
- Angela Hucles (b. 1978) – sports executive and former professional soccer player
- Daniel Hudson (b. 1987) – MLB player
- Jay Hoffman (b. 1951) – coached Hampton Roads Mariners; played professionally in the Canadian National Soccer League
- Bubba Jenkins (b. 1988) – NCAA wrestling national champion and MMA fighter
- Jen Kiggans (b. 1971) – U.S. representative, former Virginia state senator
- Roy Lassiter (b. 1969) – Hampton Roads Mariner; Major League Soccer; USA National Team
- B. J. Leiderman (b. 1956) – composer of themes for NPR shows
- Marc Leishman (b. 1983) – professional golfer
- Darin Lewis (b. 1976) – Hampton Roads Mariner; MLS New York MetroStars
- EJ Manuel (b. 1990) – NFL quarterback for the Oakland Raiders
- Evan Marriott – actor in Joe Millionaire
- Kára McCullough, winner of Miss USA 2017, finished top ten in Miss Universe 2017
- Bob McDonnell (b. 1954) – former governor of Virginia
- Shane McFaul (b. 1986) – Hampton Roads Mariner; Republic of Ireland U21
- Ryan McGinness (b. 1972) – artist
- Jason Miyares, Attorney General of Virginia
- Darryl Monroe (b. 1986) – professional basketball player, 2016 Israeli Basketball Premier League MVP
- Guy Morgan (b. 1960), former NBA player
- Shawn Morimando (b. 1992) – MLB player
- Lenda Murray (b. 1962) – IFBB professional bodybuilder
- Jamia Nash (b. 1996) – singer, actress
- Juice Newton (b. 1952) – singer, songwriter
- Derrick Nnadi (b. 1996) – NFL defensive tackle
- Sean Poppen, MLB player
- Scott Presler, conservative activist
- Pusha T (b. 1977) – rapper
- Neil Ramírez (b. 1989) – MLB player
- J.R. Reid (b. 1968) – NBA player
- Mark Reynolds (b. 1983) – third baseman/first baseman for the Baltimore Orioles from Virginia Beach; drafted in 2004 by the Arizona Diamondbacks in the 16th round (476th overall)
- Teddy Riley, music producer
- Pat Robertson (1930–2023) – television preacher
- David Robinson (b. 1965) – 10x All-Star, NBA MVP, 2x NBA Champion, 2x Olympic gold medalist, member of Naismith Memorial Basketball Hall of Fame, briefly grew up in Virginia Beach
- Aaron Rouse (b. 1984) – NFL player and politician
- Mark Ruffalo (b. 1967) – Oscar-nominated actor; raised in Virginia Beach
- Todd Schnitt (b. 1966) – radio personality
- Herbert Scott (b. 1953) – Kellam High School, Virginia Union University, Dallas Cowboys offensive lineman in NFL for 10 seasons, 3× Pro Bowl, 2× First-team All-Pro, winner of Super Bowl XII
- Rhea Seehorn (b. 1972) – actress known for role as Kim Wexler in Better Call Saul
- Julie Shiflet (b. 1972) – professional tennis player
- Scott Sizemore (b. 1985) – MLB player
- smokedope2016 (b. 2001) – rapper and record producer
- Chris Taylor (b. 1990) – MLB player
- Ian Thomas (b. 1987) – MLB player
- Shamarko Thomas (b. 1991) – Pittsburgh Steelers safety and 111th pick overall in the 2013 NFL draft; starred at Ocean Lakes High School in Virginia Beach
- Timbaland (b. 1972) – music producer
- Lil Tracy (b. 1995) – rapper, singer and songwriter
- Kendra Todd, real estate broker, winner of The Apprentice
- Turnover – indie rock band
- Travis Wall (b. 1987) – choreographer and contestant on So You Think You Can Dance
- Matthew E. White (b. 1982) – songwriter and producer
- Elizabeth Williams (b. 1993), played college basketball at Duke University, WNBA player for Atlanta Dream
- Mark Williams, played college basketball for Duke Blue Devils, NBA player for Charlotte Hornets
- Matt Williams (b. 1971) – MLB player
- Pharrell Williams (b. 1973) – rapper, singer, record producer, composer and fashion designer
- Glenn Yates Jr. (1927–2022) – architect and Virginia state legislator
- Hunter Yeany (b. 2005) – racing driver
- Glenn Youngkin (b. 1966) – elected governor of Virginia in 2021
- Ryan Zimmerman (b. 1984) – MLB player

== Williamsburg ==
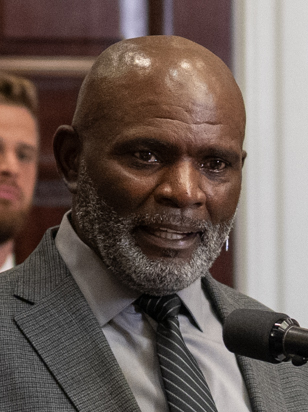
Lawrence Taylor

- Jimmy Fortune (b. 1955) – vocalist with the Statler Brothers
- Bruce Hornsby (b. 1954) – singer and songwriter
- Linda Lavin (b. 1937) – actress
- Seven Mary Three – alternative rock band
- Canaan Smith (b. 1984) – country music artist
- Ron Springs (b. 1956) – running back for the Dallas Cowboys and the Tampa Bay Buccaneers
- Shawn Springs (b. 1975) – football player for the Washington Redskins
- Lawrence Taylor (b. 1959) – former professional football player for the New York Giants; professional wrestler; member of the Pro Football Hall of Fame
- George Wythe (1726–1806) – first professor of law at William and Mary; taught future presidents Thomas Jefferson and James Monroe, and future chief justice of the Supreme Court John Marshall; signer of the Declaration of Independence

== York County ==
- Terry Kirby (b. 1970) – professional football player for the Miami Dolphins and Oakland Raiders
- Wayne Kirby (b. 1964) – Major League Baseball player for the Los Angeles Dodgers and Cleveland Indians
- Thomas Nelson, Jr. (1738–1789) – signer of the Declaration of Independence
- Bryan Randall (b. 1983) – 2005 ACC Football Player of the Year
- Chris Slade (b. 1971) – professional football player for the New England Patriots
