= Confederate Monument (Portsmouth, Virginia) =

- U.S. National Register of Historic Places
- Virginia Landmarks Register
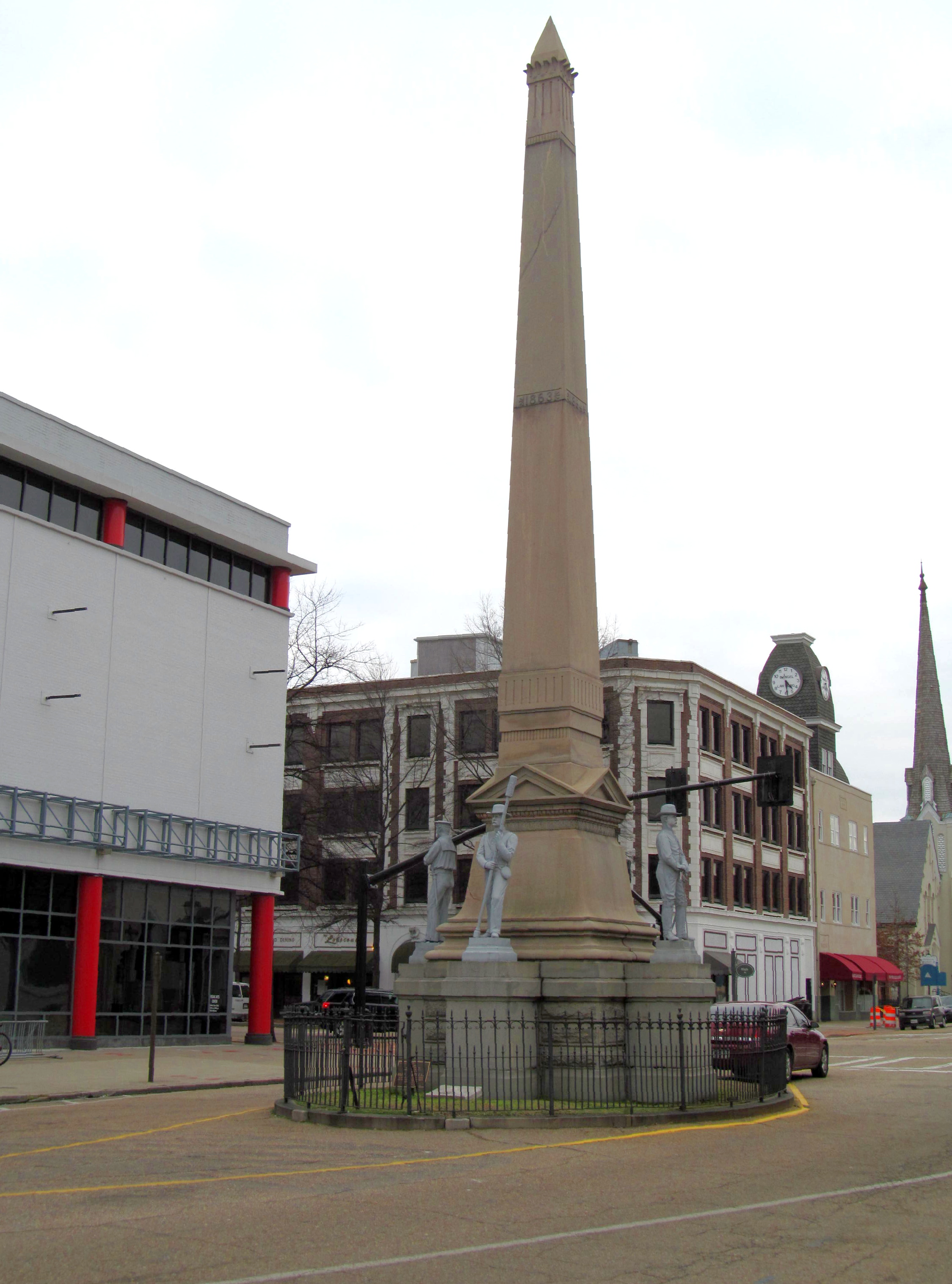
- Confederate Monument

- Location within Virginia Location within the United States
- Location: Jct. of High and Court Sts., Portsmouth, Virginia
- Coordinates: 36°50′6″N 76°18′4″W
- Area: less than one acre
- Built: 1876–1881
- Architect: Charles E. Cassell
- NRHP reference No.: 97000956
- VLR No.: 124-0183

Significant dates
- Added to NRHP: September 4, 1997
- Designated VLR: December 4, 1996

The Confederate Monument in Portsmouth, Virginia, was built between 1876 and 1881. It was listed on the National Register of Historic Places (NRHP) in 1997.

The monument was a 35-foot obelisk of North Carolina granite. It was located at the town square of Portsmouth, on Court Street at the corner of High Street. Also on the town square where the monument was formerly located are the Trinity Episcopal Church dating from 1828 and the Portsmouth Courthouse dating from 1846, which are also NRHP-listed.

It was erected by the Ladies Memorial Aid Association of Portsmouth, Virginia, which was founded in 1866 with one purpose "being the erection of a monument to the Confederate dead of Portsmouth and Norfolk County." The design was by topographical engineer Charles E. Cassell.

The cornerstone was laid in 1876.The monument's capstone was not placed until 1881, and the monument as a whole was not completed until 1893.

The four cast white bronze figures that surrounded the obelisk, including their heads and facial features, were largely generic. The sailor figure, for example, also appeared outside the G.A.R. Memorial Hall in Wabash, Indiana.

The city of Portsmouth "gave 1,242 men to the Confederacy of whom 199 were killed or died; Norfolk County gave 1,018 men to the cause of whom 280 were killed or died; and the City of Norfolk gave 1,119 of whom 176 were killed or died."

== Calls for removal and relocation ==
In August 2017, in the wake of the "Unite the Right" rally in Charlottesville, Virginia, where many White Supremacist groups protested the removal of Confederate monuments, mayor of Portsmouth John Rowe called for the movement of the monument from its current location. Mayor Rowe's proposed new site for the monument is nearby Cedar Grove Cemetery where many Confederate soldiers are buried. Shortly after the mayor's announcement, a Change.org petition amassing over 30,000 signatures went viral started by a local Virginia man named Nathan Coflin to have the current monument replaced by a statue of Portsmouth native rap artist and businesswoman, Missy Elliott. This petition received national attention in many publications such as Newsweek, CNN, People and Time magazine.

On June 10, 2020, a Black Lives Matter protest took place in the city. The Confederate soldier statues were beheaded by sledgehammer and one was toppled by protesters as the Police Department watched. A brass band played. One protester, Chris Green, was hit by the falling statue and sustained life-threatening injuries while standing near other people below it. The statue was also spraypainted by protesters. In August 2020, nineteen people, including state senator Louise Lucas, Chief Public Defender Brenda Spry, two additional public defenders, Portsmouth School Board member LaKeesha Atkinson, and three local NAACP representatives were charged with felony vandalism of the monument. Police Chief Angela Greene announced the charges on August 17, 2020, one day prior to the Virginia General Assembly's special legislative session pushing for policing reform. The charges were condemned by the Virginia Legislative Black Caucus and multiple Virginia politicians expressed concern about the timing. The police department circumvented the commonwealth's attorney to obtain the charges, taking the charges directly to the magistrate. Later, the Commonwealth's Attorney Stephanie Morales stated there was insufficient evidence to take any of the nineteen defendants to trial. Due to the fact that so many local attorneys and public officials were charged or subpoenaed as witnesses, judges in Portsmouth recused themselves, and Judge Claire G. Cardwell was brought in from Richmond to hear the case. Cardwell dismissed the charges in November 2020. Judge Cardwell found that police intentionally went around prosecutors to file charges and attempted to prevent Morales from prosecuting the case by subpoenaing her as a witness. Cardwell found the charges concerning and believed the police did not take out the charges out of concern for public safety. Police Chief Angela Greene was fired shortly before Cardwell's dismissal of the charges. Ten of the nineteen individuals who were charged sued the city for violating their rights, claiming that they were improperly defamed. In October 2021 the city settled the lawsuit, writing them checks for $15,000 each.

== Removal ==
On July 28, 2020, the Portsmouth City Council voted unanimously to remove the monument. On August 26, 2020, crews officially began removing the monument from Olde Towne and moving it to a undisclosed storage area. The monument has since been removed.

== See also ==
- List of monuments and memorials removed during the George Floyd protests
