= Killing of William Chapman =

2015 police killing in Virginia

- Date: April 22, 2015
- Time: 7:30 a.m.
- Location: Portsmouth, Virginia, U.S.
- Participants: William Chapman (death); Stephen D. Rankin (shooter)
- Deaths: William Chapman
- Charges: First degree murder
- Convictions: Voluntary manslaughter

The killing of William L. Chapman II, a black 18-year-old, occurred on April 22, 2015, in Portsmouth, Virginia, United States, when Chapman was shot and killed in a Wal-Mart parking lot by Portsmouth Police Officer Stephen D. Rankin. Rankin had been responding to a report of suspected shoplifting and engaged in a physical struggle with Chapman, who instigated the altercation while trying to arrest him. The shooting occurred approximately four years after the killing of Kirill Denyakin, who died after being shot by Rankin in 2011.

In September 2015, Rankin was indicted on the charge of first-degree murder in Chapman's death, and was found guilty by a jury of voluntary manslaughter on August 4, 2016. Upon the jury's recommendation, Rankin was sentenced to two-and-a-half years in prison.

== Shooting ==
Wal-Mart store security called police at 7:30 a.m., reporting that a shoplifter was leaving the store. Rankin approached William Chapman across the parking lot, and a struggle between the two ensued. According to witnesses, Chapman broke free but then stepped back towards Rankin, at which point Rankin shot him twice. He was shot in the face and chest. An autopsy on Chapman found no evidence of a close-range gunshot, indicating that he was shot from several feet away. He was pronounced dead at the scene. Chapman's body was taken to the Office of the Chief Medical Examiner with his hands cuffed behind his back. A state toxicology report indicated Chapman had no traces of alcohol or drugs in his system.

== Legal proceedings ==
The Commonwealth of Virginia's Attorney's Office announced they were seeking an indictment. On September 3, a grand jury indicted Rankin on a charge of first degree murder and use of a firearm in commission of a felony. Rankin turned himself in to a jail and was released on $75,000 bond.

Prosecutors said that Rankin could have used non-lethal force. Rankin's defense said that he had to shoot Chapman after a stun gun failed to stop him. A crane driver stated that Chapman had acted aggressively toward the police officer and had charged at him. However Gregory Provo, a Wal-Mart security guard who reported the allegations of Chapman shoplifting, testified that Chapman never charged at the officer, and had his hands raised in a boxing-style, and said "Are you going to fucking shoot me?" when he was standing six feet (1.8 m) away from Chapman. On August 4, 2016, Rankin was found not guilty by a jury of first degree murder, but was found guilty on the lesser charge of voluntary manslaughter. He received a sentence of 30 months in October 2016. Rankin was released from the Dillwyn Correctional Center on November 19, 2018.

== See also ==
- List of unarmed African Americans killed by law enforcement officers in the United States
- Killing of Kirill Denyakin
