= List of killings by law enforcement officers in the United States, April 2011 =

This is a list of people reported killed by non-military law enforcement officers in the United States in April 2011, whether in the line of duty or not, and regardless of reason or method. The listing documents the occurrence of a death, making no implications regarding wrongdoing or justification on the part of the person killed or officer involved. Killings are arranged by date of the incident that caused death. Different death dates, if known, are noted in the description. The table below lists 28 people.

== April 2011 ==
Date	Name (Age) of Deceased	State (city)	Description
2011-04-30	Campuzano, Jose Carlos	Washington (Sunnyside)	Shot after pulling out a gun and shooting at officers. Police has pulled over a vehicle containing three people, including Campuzano, as suspects in a recent nearby shooting.
2011-04-29	Simpson, Corey (21)	Florida (Sunrise)	
2011-04-28	Espinoza, Rodrigo (22)	Florida (Pomona Park)	
2011-04-27	Robert Blackwell (46)	Ohio (Bowling Green)	
2011-04-26	Jeffrey Davis (27)	Vermont (Williamstown)	
2011-04-25	Corey Brown (31)	New Jersey (Trenton)	
2011-04-23	Denyakin, Kirill	Virginia (Portsmouth)	Shot outside of an apartment building where he was staying with friends; was intoxicated and did not respond to police commands to lie down on the ground. A 9-1-1 call had erroneously reported a burglary in progress at that address after Denyakin pounded on the door and asked to be let back into the building.
2011-04-19	Durrall Jessie Miller (24)	Florida (Miami Gardens)	
2011-04-18	Ourada, Anthony	Washington (Kent)	Shot after ramming into several cars while attempting to elude deputies. Deputies were pursuing Ourada for several instances of reckless driving and eluding police over the previous week.
2011-04-18	Williams, Jerome	Illinois (Chicago)	Shot during armed robbery of store and after shooting at police.
2011-04-18	Charlez, Robert (40)	Arizona (Phoenix)	
2011-04-18	Hebert, David	Ohio (Cincinnati)	Shot after a report of an armed robbery with a sword. Hebert had a small knife but no sword. Acting against their training, officers got dangerously close and failed to have a plan before approaching Hebert, precipitating the use of deadly force. A wrongful death lawsuit by his estate alleges Hebert was complying with orders when he was shot.
2011-04-18	Miller, Durrall (24)	Florida (Miami Gardens)	
2011-04-18	Aikee Holloman (23)	Pennsylvania (Philadelphia)	
2011-04-16	Parks, Horace Lorenzo	Georgia (Morgan County)	Shot after pointing gun at state trooper. Parks was being chased for driving a vehicle which matched the description from a recent shooting at a restaurant. The chase ended when Parks rammed a police vehicle.
2011-04-14	Felber, Johann "Joe" (45)	Florida (Milton)	
2011-04-13	Larry Marsh (41)	Pennsylvania (Earl Township)	
2011-04-13	Unnamed man	Pennsylvania (New Holland)	
2011-04-12	Christopher Torres (27)	New Mexico (Albuquerque)	
2011-04-07	Denton, Albert	Maryland (Glenn Dale)	Shot after lunging at officers with axe. Police were responding to report of disturbance at child daycare facility.
2011-04-06	Solmen, John (48)	Arizona (Phoenix)	
2011-04-06	Fuller, Darryl	Georgia (Norcross)	Shot after pointing a handgun at officers. Police were patrolling an area known for gang activity and approached a group of three men when Fuller drew a weapon.
2011-04-05	Singletary, Jamal (24)	Florida (Miami)	
2011-04-04	Chaparro, Audencio (51)	Arizona (Phoenix)	
2011-04-03	Woods, Timothy	Georgia (Fairburn)	Shot went a gun, not in the officers possession, "went off" while the officer and Woods struggled over a gun.
2011-04-03	Rust, Craig (54)	Florida (Ocala)	
2011-04-02	Shanafelt, Betty (62)	Arizona (Cottonfield)	
2011-04-01	Greene, Jason (31)	Florida (Orlando)	

== See also ==
- Death in custody § United States
- Henry A. Wallace Police Crime Public Database
- List of cases of police brutality
- List of countries with annual rates and counts for killings by law enforcement officers
- List of law enforcement officers killed in the line of duty in the United States
- List of law enforcement officers convicted for an on-duty killing in the United States
- List of shootings by US immigration agents
- List of police reforms related to the George Floyd protests
- List of unarmed African Americans killed by law enforcement officers in the United States
- Lists of killings by law enforcement officers
- Police brutality in the United States
- Police misconduct § United States
- Police riot § United States
- Police use of deadly force in the United States
