= North Carolina District Courts =

In the U.S. state of North Carolina, District Courts are tribunals inferior to the Superior Court. In criminal matters, they have jurisdiction over misdemeanor and infraction cases. In civil matters, the courts have original jurisdiction over civil disputes with an amount in controversy under $25,000, divorces, child custody disputes, and child support payments.

== History ==
In the early 1900s, the North Carolina Superior Court grew increasingly burdened with criminal cases and other local affairs. In response, the North Carolina General Assembly created over 100 separate lower courts by "special act". In 1917, the General Assembly ceased this practice and created "general law" courts—inferior to the Superior Court but higher than justice of the peace courts—in a partially-standardized manner. Thus, by the mid-20th century, minor cases and those concerning domestic matters in North Carolina were handled by a variety of local tribunals, including justice of the peace courts, city and county recorder's courts, domestic relations courts, and juvenile courts. In 1957, there were 940 justices of the peace, 256 general law courts, and 70 surviving special act courts. These tribunals varied greatly in procedure, jurisdiction, jury composition, fees and compensation, and other affairs.

In 1955, the North Carolina Bar Association convened a Committee on Improving and Expediting the Administration of Justice to draft proposals for court reform in the state. Completing its work in 1958, the committee recommended consolidating the state's courts into a unified General Court of Justice. New "District Courts" were proposed to succeed the recorder's courts and justice of the peace courts as standard local trial courts. Through the late 1950s and 1960s, North Carolina's judicial system was overhauled by legislation and constitutional amendment. District Courts were phased-in beginning in December 1966 in 23 counties. An additional 60 counties were brought in under District Courts in 1968, and the remainder were phased-in in December 1970.

== Jurisdiction and administration ==
The District Court Division, alongside the Appellate Division, and the Superior Court Division, make up North Carolina's unified court system, the General Court of Justice. The courts operate in 43 districts in the state. In criminal matters, they have jurisdiction over misdemeanor and infraction cases adjudicated without the presence of a jury. State law also allows them to try some low-level felony cases with the agreement of a judge and the prosecution and defense. In civil matters, the courts have original jurisdiction over civil disputes with an amount in controversy under $25,000, divorces, child custody disputes, and child support payments. Magistrates in the court issue criminal processes, perform marriages, hear eviction and other small claims cases, and order involuntary commitments.

As of 2022, there are 282 District Court judges. District judges are popularly-elected to serve a term of four years. The chief justice of the North Carolina Supreme Court appoints a chief district judge for each district. The chief judge schedules district court sessions for their district, assigns district court judges to preside in sessions, and oversees the magistrates for each county in the district.

== Works cited ==
- Fleer, Jack D. (1994). North Carolina Government & Politics. Lincoln: University of Nebraska Press. ISBN 9780803268852.
- The History of North Carolina Courts (PDF), North Carolina General Court of Justice, December 10, 2020
- Orth, John V.; Newby, Paul M. (2013). The North Carolina State Constitution (second ed.). Oxford University Press. ISBN 9780199300655.
