= Clif Tinker =

American artist (born 1956)

Clifton "Clif" Tinker (b. Portsmouth, Virginia, October 2, 1956) is a San Antonio, Texas-based commercial artist. He has done commissions for the San Antonio Spurs NBA basketball team, the San Antonio Public Library, the Texas State Teachers' Association (TSTA), Dillard's Department Store, and the HEB Grocery Company. He has also worked as a cartoonist and an illustrator. As a painter, collagist, and printmaker, he is represented by Artistic Endeavors Gallery. His art studio practice focuses on expressionistic scenic paintings, and cartoon-style imagery. Since 1986, he has been an art instructor, first at the San Antonio Art Institute at the McNay Art Museum, and then in San Antonio public schools.

== Education and teaching ==
Tinker graduated from Fullerton Union High School in California in 1974. He earned his BA in psychology from the University of Houston in 1981. He was a daily cartoonist for the Daily Cougar (The University of Houston student newspaper) in 1985 and a weekly cartoonist for the Paisano, the University of Texas at San Antonio (UTSA) student newspaper in 1988. He earned a BFA in painting from UTSA in 1992, and an MA in art history in 2001. His master's thesis treated the Aztec Theater, a Mayan Revival building in downtown San Antonio. Tinker began his teaching career in 1986, at the San Antonio Art Institute, during the last seven years of its existence. He is in his thirty-first year of public school teaching, currently working at James Madison High School as an art teacher and as the Chair of the Fine Arts Department. Tinker also serves as Treasurer of the San Antonio Art Education Association.

== Public commissions ==
In 1993 Tinker designed a set of 80,000 square feet nylon banners, called "The Transition Game" for the Alamodome, the second home of the San Antonio Spurs. His charge was to create "a more intimate environment" for spectators when the upper-level seats were not used. He sought an atmosphere of "celebration," one that would "capture the essence of basketball," which the artist likened to "a powerful athletic dance." In addition, Tinker was thinking of Fiesta, San Antonio's annual city-wide festival, and he mimicked the visual effects of the colorful cascarones and confetti that are utilized in that celebration.

The San Antonio Express-News said some considered the 36 banners that comprise "The Transition Game" to be the "largest cloth sculpture in Texas." It was described by then-Spurs official Rebecca Caven as "the largest work of art in Texas." Tinker says the Spurs wanted a "hand-done artwork" rather than a computer-generated piece. The work was created by making tiny collages one-inch-by-six-inches, which were then projected onto large rolls of nylon. The cut-outs were sewn with special machinery by Miller Curtains and fabricated by Team Design Studios.

Tinker has had three T-shirt designs produced by Dillard's Department Store, beginning in 1998, with his design being the first-runner up for the annual Fiesta poster.

In 2003, Tinker designed the poster for the San Antonio Public Library Centennial. It depicts the Central Library building (designed by Ricardo Legorreta), the Alamo Mission Church, as well as four writers: Mark Twain, Maya Angelou, William Shakespeare, and Diane Gonzales Bertrand.

In 2004 Tinker designed "San Antonio Spurs Then and Now", a commemorative poster commissioned by the Spurs to chronicle the history of the team for season ticket holders.

Tinker created the Texas State Teachers Association 125th anniversary poster in 2005. It used an expressionistic painting by the artist that depicts the organization's headquarters and the Texas State Capitol.

Tinker was commissioned by the HEB Grocery company in 2010 to design a reusable shopping bag. This bag, adorned with a wrap-around work called "The San Antonio Montage," features San Antonio's most famous landmarks. It quickly sold out, and Tinker was commissioned to design five additional reusable bags. Tinker has designed various other kitchen items for HEB, including aprons, coffee mugs, drink tumblers, tortilla warmers, hot pads, oven mitts, trays, plates, and cutting boards. All of these objects feature brightly colored cartoonish imagery, including a design that San Antonio Express-News reporter Michael Quintanilla described as "a red hot chile pepper atop a purple bucking armadillo."

== Collections ==
Tinker has eight paintings and three posters in the UTSA Art Collection. Chili's purchased 11 of Tinker's paintings in the 1990s, and Tinker has paintings in other San Antonio restaurants. Collectors own his works in all regions of the US. He also has collectors in Scandinavia.

== Book illustrations ==
Tinker has illustrated three books. He did book covers for Apriendiendo paso a paso (San Antonio: Wings Press, 2010) and A Heart Exchange: the Story of Sister Joyce Bloom, FSPA (2014). Tinker also made illustrations for a yoga book called Be Still and Know: Every Teacher has a Teaching (2022).

== Exhibitions ==
Tinker has been in over 30 group exhibitions and he has had more than 20 solo exhibitions, primarily in San Antonio. These include a retrospective exhibition at San Antonio Central Library Gallery in 2005. He had two one person shows in 1998: "Remember the Alamo" at the Stone Works Restaurant and Bar in San Antonio, and "View from the Top" at the Alamodome. The latter featured images of San Antonio's skyline, including the Alamodome, Brackenridge Park, and Sunset Station. In 2004 he was featured in an exhibition of artists from Southwest called "Arte Contemporaneo" at the Centro Aztlán in San Antonio. Tinker was also featured in an exhibition of teachers at Dock Space Gallery in San Antonio in 2019.

== Awards ==
Tinker was inducted onto the Fullerton Union High School Wall of Fame in 2010.

A Tinker painting served as the basis for the winning Texas Arts & Crafts Educational Foundation 2011 Commemorative Poster contest prize.

In 2013 he received the Best of Show Award from the San Antonio Art Education Association in the "Artists Who Teach Exhibition" for the collage "Crazy Splendor".

In 2018 Tinker was awarded the Friends of the San Antonio Library Arts and Letters Award, which serves to "recognize and celebrate achievement by individuals who have demonstrated outstanding accomplishments in the arts and letters".
