= Brenda Spry =

American judge

- Incumbent
- Assumed office February 16, 2021

Personal details
- Education: Old Dominion University; William & Mary Law School (J.D.)
- Occupation: Judge, Circuit Court

Brenda Spry is a judge for the Third Circuit of Virginia. She previously served as the chief public defender for the Portsmouth, Virginia, office of the Virginia Indigent Defense Commission.

== Early life and education ==
Spry attended Old Dominion University, receiving a degree in criminal justice. She then attended William & Mary Law School, receiving a Juris Doctor. When she began law school, she was not sure if she would want to be a lawyer for her full career, but later described the legal profession as "built for her."

== Career ==
In 1990, after finishing law school, Spry began working at the Virginia Indigent Defense Commission's Portsmouth office. She remained there for thirty years, eventually becoming chief public defender of the Portsmouth office in 2008 after John Underwood, who established the office, died at age 55. Prior to Underwood's death, Spry had been the chief deputy public defender in the office. Spry continued to run the office for thirteen years. In 1998, Spry represented Elton Jackson, a suspected serial killer in the Hampton Roads region. Prosecutor Brandon Wrobleski filed a complaint against Spry for her handling of the case of Will Patterson Jr., a teenager who was accused of attempting to murder a Portsmouth police officer in November 2017. Spry stated that her office, which represented Patterson, was made aware of his incompetency to stand trial and mental health issues after he was found guilty in April 2018 but prior to his sentencing. As a result, his conviction had to be vacated, and a new trial was ordered. The complaint from Wrobleski was dismissed by both the Virginia Indigent Defense Commission and the Virginia Bar Association. During Spry's time as a public defender, she had court appearances nearly every day.

In June 2020, Spry attended a protest in Portsmouth, and in August 2020 she was one of nineteen people, including two other public defenders, state senator Louise Lucas, and three NAACP representatives, charged with felony vandalism of the local Confederate monument. The charges were announced by the police department one day prior to a special legislative session which pushed for policing reform. The Virginia Legislative Black Caucus condemned the charges and multiple Virginia politicians were concerned about the timing of the charges. At the time the charges were announced, commonwealth's attorney's office had not approved the charges and the police department had taken the charges directly to the magistrate. Later, the Commonwealth's Attorney Stephanie Morales stated there was insufficient evidence to take any of the nineteen defendants to trial and a judge dismissed the charged in November 2020. The judge, Claire G. Cardwell, found that police went around prosecutors to file charges and attempted to prevent Morales from prosecuting the case by subpoenaing her as a witness. Cardwell thought the charges were concerning, suggesting the police were not motivated by public safety. Police Chief Angela Greene was fired shortly before the dismissal of the charges. Spry and ten others charged sued the city, claiming that their rights were violated, and they were improperly defamed, and in October 2021 they received settlement checks from the city for $15,000 each.

On January 26, 2021, Spry was appointed to the Virginia Circuit Court in Portsmouth by the Virginia General Assembly for an eight-year term beginning on February 16, 2021. She was elected by the 100-member Virginia House of Delegates with only a 51-vote majority. Republican Todd Gilbert was one of the only Republicans to vote for Spry. In the Virginia Senate, Spry received 33 votes. Most Republicans did not vote at all, and two delegates from each party abstained.
