= Debbie Horton =

American guitarist, DJ and songwriter

Debbie Horton is an American guitarist, DJ and songwriter, who is the only woman to have ever played lead guitar for Johnny Cash.

== Biography ==
Horton was born in Newport News, Virginia, United States.

During a concert near Baltimore, Maryland, Johnny Cash had heard that Debbie Horton was there and that she played lead guitar in a similar way to Luther Perkins. During the concert Cash called Horton out of the audience to join him on stage to perform a song with him. Cash sang "Big River", while Horton played lead guitar. Horton holds the distinction of being the only woman to have played lead guitar for Cash.

Horton has written many songs and two of her compositions were recorded by Pretty Miss Norma Jean and Wanda Jackson.

Latterly she was the owner and co-host of a traveling show from Branson, Missouri, Branson On The Road, featuring a tribute to Johnny Cash. She could be seen regularly on the RFD-TV television show, Midwest Country. The show toured from 2005 to 2025.

On May 27, 2016, Horton made her debut on the Grand Ole Opry.

After a nationwide audition, Debbie Horton was selected as lead guitarist for the 2023–2024 international tour of Johnny Cash: The Official Concert Experience, produced by GEAlive, Quatro Entertainment, the Estate of Johnny Cash, John Carter Cash, and Sandbox Succession. She performed lead guitar across all 108 shows of the tour.
