= Virginia Indigent Defense Commission =

Public defense organization in Virginia

Organization overview
- Formed: 1972 as the Public Defender Commission
- Preceding Organization: Public Defender Commission
- Jurisdiction: Commonwealth of Virginia
- Headquarters: 200-1604 Santa Rosa Rd, Richmond, Virginia, 23229
- Organization executive: Maria Jankowski, Executive Director
- Parent Organization: Virginia General Assembly
- Website: .vadefenders.org

The Virginia Indigent Defense Commission (VIDC) provides legal defense to those accused of crimes unable to afford a private lawyer. VIDC operates 28 offices across the Commonwealth of Virginia. VIDC also manages the certification of public defenders and court-appointed attorneys throughout Virginia and provides training to defense attorneys.

VIDC relies on a non-traditional "holistic" approach that also sees attorneys arranging social supports, addiction services and other assistance for those accused of crime, to reduce recidivism rates.

== History ==
=== Public Defender Commission (1972–2004) ===
In 1972, the Virginia General Assembly piloted two Public Defender offices to determine if they would work better than appointing private attorneys to cases with indigent clients. The Staunton office was opened first, followed by the Virginia Beach office a few months later. The first chief public defender of the Staunton office, Coy M. Kiser, Jr. started the office with one investigator, a secretary, and two part-time assistant public defenders. Kiser was appointed to a judgeship two years later and was replaced by William E. Bobbitt, who served in the Staunton office for over thirty years.

=== Virginia Indigent Defense Commission (2004–present) ===
Following the American Bar Association's "scathing report on the state of indigent defense in Virginia", the VIDC was established by statute in 2004 and replaced the Public Defender Commission. The VIDC replaced court-appointed lawyers in death penalty cases with full-time public defenders. David Johnson was named Executive Director of the agency in 2005.

In 2020, several VIDC employees attended a protest in Portsmouth and three were charged with felony vandalism of a Confederate monument, alongside state senator Louise Lucas, and three NAACP representatives. Judge Claire G. Cardwell dismissed the charges in November 2020. Cardwell determined that police went around prosecutors to file charges and attempted to prevent Commonwealth's Attorney Stephanie Morales from prosecuting the case by subpoenaing her as a witness. The three public defenders and eight others received settlement checks from the city for $15,000 each.

In March 2021, Virginia banned capital punishment and VIDC announced that the capital defense offices located in Vienna, Norfolk, Roanoke, and Richmond would close.

In September 2022, Maria Jankowski was promoted from Deputy Executive Director of VIDC to Executive Director after David Johnson retired. Timothy Coyne, the former Chief Public Defender for the Winchester and Front Royal offices, was named to replace Jankowski as Deputy Executive Director of the commission.

In 2023, it was revealed that some of the offices were struggling with workload, with 30% fewer lawyers than expected and each one handling up to 200 cases. As of November 2023, VIDC had 28 offices that were staffed to cover approximately 72% of the court-appointed caseload.

== Locations ==
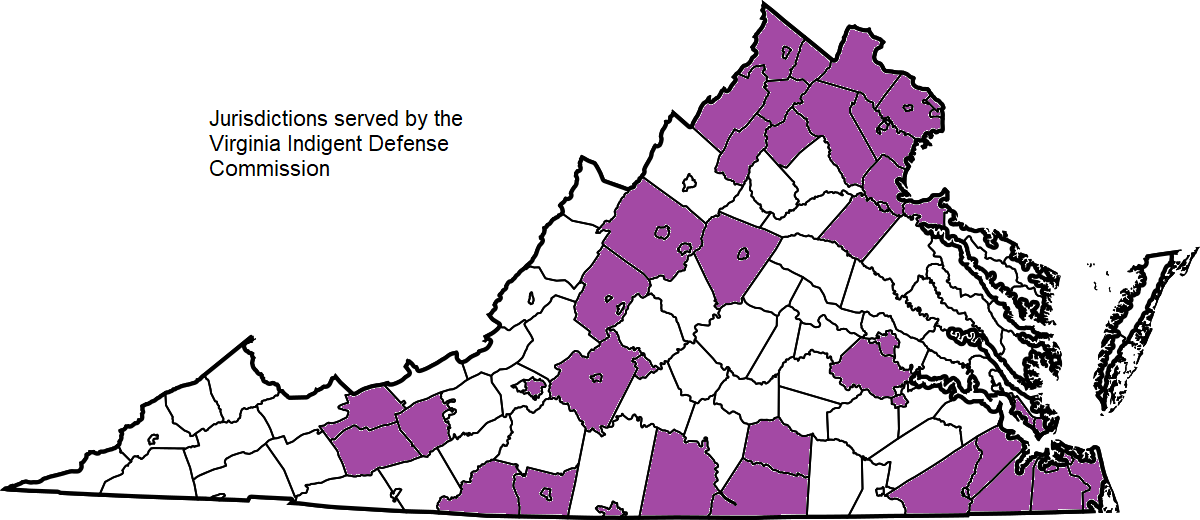

- Alexandria
- Arlington County
- Bedford
- Charlottesville
- Chesapeake
- Chesterfield
- Danville
- Fairfax
- Franklin
- Fredericksburg - serves Stafford, Spotsylvania, and King George counties
- Front Royal - serves Shenandoah, Warren, and Page counties
- Halifax
- Hampton
- Leesburg - serves Loudoun County
- Lexington
- Lynchburg
- Martinsville
- Newport News
- Norfolk
- Petersburg
- Portsmouth
- Prince William County
- Pulaski
- Richmond
- Roanoke
- Staunton - serves Augusta and Rockbridge counties
- Suffolk
- Virginia Beach
- Warrenton
- Winchester - serves Frederick County and Clarke County

== Notable employees and former employees ==
- Claire G. Cardwell, judge for the Thirteenth Circuit of Virginia
- Coy M. Kiser, Jr. (1933-2012), first public defender in Virginia and judge in the General District Court of the 25th Judicial District of Virginia
- Brenda Spry, judge for the Third Circuit of Virginia
