= Shirley H. Scheibla =

American journalist

Shirley Hobbs Scheibla
- Born: 1919; Newport News, Virginia
- Died: March 18, 2000 (aged 80–81)
- Education: University of North Carolina
- Occupations: Journalist, author

Shirley Hobbs Scheibla (1919–2000) was a journalist for The Wall Street Journal from 1943 to 1948 and for Barron's from 1962 until her retirement in 1992.

== Early life ==
Scheibla was born in 1919 in Newport News, Virginia. She was educated at the University of North Carolina.

== Journalism career ==
Shirley H. Scheibla was the first female reporter at The Wall Street Journal, hired during World War II as an economics reporter in Washington DC. During her Wall Street Journal tenure, she used her initials "S.S. Scheibla" until she was married, after which she used "S.H. Scheibla". Editors at The Wall Street Journal at the time were not sure whether she would be taken seriously by readers if it was known she was a woman. It wasn't until her 1995 article, written in her retirement, that she got a byline with her full name.

Her journalism included news articles and editorials that led to government investigations. She also reported on consumer and environment beats. Shirley's most important articles included the conversion of ice cream makers into frozen vegetable producers in 1943, red meat consumption in 1943, implications of Philippine independence in 1945, the U.S. government helping small businesses in 1945, increases in wages in 1947 and 1948 and happenings in the world of unions.

In 1968, she published the book Poverty is Where the Money Is with Arlington House.

== Public activism ==
While in retirement, she founded Partners for Patients, a nonprofit organization to educate the public about the world of hospitals and caregivers. She announced its founding in a 1995 article in The Wall Street Journal. This article spurred a series of Letters to the Editor, in particular about the diagnosis rate she cited, which may have been incorrect. In her article, she described her personal experience of visiting a hospital 10 times without a correct diagnosis of what was making her sick, and then about her husband's fatal illness. These experiences sparked her exploration into the health system and an interest in improving it.

Scheibla died on March 18, 2000.
