= Killing of Kirill Denyakin =

2011 police shooting in Portsmouth, Virginia

Coordinates: 36.835857°N 76.30566°W

Kirill Ivanovich Denyakin (Russian: Кирилл Иванович Денякин) was a 26-year-old Kazakhstani national, who was shot and killed by police officer Stephen Rankin in Portsmouth, Virginia on the evening of April 23, 2011. Unarmed at the time of the shooting, Denyakin was shot by Rankin, who was responding to a disturbance call at the home where Denyakin was staying.

According to Portsmouth Police Department, Denyakin had ignored Rankin's verbal orders and lunged at him aggressively just prior to the shooting, forcing Rankin to defend himself. Denyakin's family and his friends have denied this account of the incident, with the family's attorney stating that Denaykin was so drunk that he could barely walk, let alone charge the officer. A grand jury declined to indict Rankin on criminal charges in February 2012, and the jury in a civil trial found him to be not culpable for Denyakin's death in March 2012.

Four years later, Rankin would shoot and kill William Chapman, a young, unarmed African-American man, in a Walmart parking lot while responding to a report of shoplifting. The killing drew comparisons from media to that of Denyakin, and Rankin would ultimately be convicted of voluntary manslaughter.

== Victim ==
Denyakin was a native of Kazakhstan. Early reports gave his surname as Suchin. His father Ivan Denyakin, mother Yelena Denyakina, and younger brother Roman Denyakin resided in Karaganda, Karagandy Province, Kazakhstan. He attended Karaganda School No. 3 and went on to a local university; in his third year of studies there in 2006, he obtained a temporary U.S. visa under the Work and Travel USA program, and moved to the United States.

A local newspaper, The Virginian-Pilot, later reported that Denyakin overstayed his visa in order to continue working in the United States. He was sending money back to Kazakhstan to help his parents support his younger brother. At the time of his death, he had been employed as a cook at the Renaissance Portsmouth Hotel for two years.

Denyakin had dated a Romanian woman named Nicoletta, but the two later separated. In February 2011, about two months before his death, Denyakin went to the building where his ex-girlfriend lived; Portsmouth police officers were summoned and arrested Denyakin at the scene, alleging that he had broken a window there and threatened them. He was charged with misdemeanor stalking, but the charges were dropped after Nicoletta failed to appear at court proceedings against Denyakin; a friend stated to reporters that she had left the United States.

After Denyakin's breakup with Nicoletta, he had no place to live, so friends Maurice and Natalya Wilson invited him to stay with them in their apartment on Green Street in the Olde Towne district of Portsmouth. Natalya was from Ukraine and spoke limited English. She communicated with Denyakin primarily in Russian.

== Shooting ==
On the afternoon he was killed, Denyakin went to the apartment of another friend, Aileen Putnam, to pick up his laundry. While at his friend's home, he consumed four or five screwdriver cocktails. According to a report in The Virginian-Pilot, Putnam became concerned by Denyakin's behavior and texted her boyfriend, who came to her apartment at around 7 PM and told Denyakin to go home and sober up. Denyakin was still intoxicated when he arrived at the Wilsons' apartment at roughly 9 PM; after an argument with Natalya, who had previously told Denyakin that she did not like seeing him drunk around her baby, Natalya left the apartment and went to the restaurant where her husband Maurice worked. She found Maurice and his friend there and asked them to come home and deal with the situation; the two men carried Denyakin outside, took away his keys, and set him on the stoop to sober up, but Maurice had to return to work, leaving Natalya alone.

Denyakin awoke roughly an hour later and began pounding on the door. Natalya became alarmed and asked her neighbor to call 9-1-1. During the call, the neighbor suggested that Denyakin was "a stranger". The dispatcher thus announced the incident as a burglary in progress. Officer Rankin was nearby dealing with a homeless man and at 10:10 PM stated to the dispatcher that he would respond to the more serious "in progress" call.

According to Rankin and other police sources, Rankin arrived at the Green Street apartment at 10:12 PM and found Denyakin standing at the same door of the building where a break-in had been reported. Rankin gave Denyakin verbal commands to turn around, but Denyakin was unresponsive to these commands, and placed his hands "at the midsection of his body, in the waistband area", before charging at Rankin, who fired his weapon "in an effort to stop the threat". There were no witnesses to the shooting, and because officer Rankin had not synchronized his belt microphone with the dashcam in his police car that night, there was no audio or video recording of the events. The Virginian-Pilot, however, later reported that Natalya had heard officer Rankin order Denyakin to "get down" three times before gunfire erupted. Less than two minutes had elapsed between Rankin's arrival on the scene and the shooting.

A second officer arrived at the scene soon after, finding the glass in the front door shattered and Denyakin on the ground. Denyakin was dead by the time paramedics arrived. An autopsy confirmed that he had 11 bullet wounds in his chest, left shoulder, right upper arm, left thigh, right flank, hip, right wrist, and left hand, and a blood alcohol content of 0.28%.

== Aftermath ==
The shooting attracted considerable media coverage, both in Virginia and in Kazakhstan. The government of Kazakhstan paid the expenses for Denyakin's mother to travel to the United States, make statements to police, and repatriate her son's body. He was buried in the Federovsky Cemetery in Karaganda in May 2011.

Erlan Idrisov, Kazakhstan's ambassador in Washington, DC, made a statement of concern to the United States Department of State, demanded a "thorough investigation", and expressed his hopes that Denyakin's relatives would be "compensated" properly. During the investigation, Kazakhstan's Ministry of Foreign Affairs communicated frequently with the State Department about the case, and with State Department officials, among them Assistant Secretary of State for South and Central Asian Affairs Robert O. Blake, Jr. as well as then-Secretary of State Hillary Clinton.

The Portsmouth Police Department did not initially reveal the identity of the officer who had shot Denyakin, but eventually released Rankin's name. Media reports noted that Officer Rankin had worked for the Portsmouth Police Department for three-and-a-half years, was a native of Central California, had served in the United States Navy from 2002 to 2007, and had been honorably discharged. Once his identity had been revealed, Rankin's social media activity immediately came under scrutiny from media in both the U.S. and Kazakhstan. Facebook postings, including a posting of the Misfits song "Mommy, Can I Go Out & Kill Tonight", an image of a lynching with the slogan "Love is … Doing whatever is necessary," and photographs of Rankin's gun and gun cleaning equipment, on which he had commented that it "would be better if i was dirtying them instead of cleaning them!"

This and other incidents involving social media activity led the International Association of Chiefs of Police to issue reminders to all officers to use caution when making social media postings. Rankin later admitted to making numerous comments on online articles at the website of The Virginian-Pilot under the pseudonym "yourealythinkthat", defending his actions and disputing other commenters who questioned them.

== Criminal investigation ==
An investigation into the shooting was handled by the Virginia State Police, while Commonwealth's Attorney Earle C. Mobley also referred the matter to a state grand jury for consideration of charges. Rankin was placed on administrative leave during the investigation. On February 9, 2012, the grand jury refused to indict Rankin.

== Civil suit ==
The Denyakin family filed a civil suit against Rankin on July 1, 2011, seeking US $22 million in damages. The suit, a civil action for deprivation of rights under 42 U.S.C. § 1983, was filed in the District Court for the Eastern District of Virginia, and came before Judge Rebecca Smith. In November, the court ordered that the Denyakin family's lawyer could have access to state police investigative records.

In February 2012, after the grand jury refused to indict Rankin on criminal charges, the judge in the civil suit ordered a trial so that a jury could hear the case against the respondents.

As early as May 2011, Denyakin's lawyers had disputed Rankin's claim that Denyakin had lunged at him, stating that with a blood alcohol of 0.28%, three-and-a-half times the state threshold for driving under the influence of alcohol, Denyakin would not have been able to walk or talk straight, let alone lunge or fight. In court, they argued that Denyakin could not have had his hands in his pants as the witness stated, because he had a bullet wounds on his hands but no holes in his jeans.

After hearing three days of testimony, the jury returned its verdict on March 3, 2012, finding that Rankin had not violated Denyakin's civil rights by using excessive force, did not act with gross negligence, and did not commit unprovoked assault and battery causing death. A subsequent appeal by Denyakin's family was unsuccessful.

== Killing of William Chapman ==
In 2015, Rankin shot William Chapman from several feet away in April 2015, following a struggle after having attempted to arrest him for shoplifting in a Wal-Mart parking lot in Portsmouth. News media drew comparisons between the Rankin's killing of Denyakin and killing of Chapman, a young African-American man who, like Denaykin, was found to be unarmed. On September 3, 2015, Rankin was indicted on a charge of first degree murder. On August 4, 2016, Rankin was found guilty of voluntary manslaughter in the case.
