= Claire G. Cardwell =

American judge

Circuit Court Judge for the Thirteenth Circuit of Virginia
- Incumbent
- Assumed office October 1, 2021
- Preceded by: Beverly W. Snukals

Richmond General District Court Judge
- In office July 1, 2017 – September 30, 2021

Personal details
- Education: University of Virginia; University of Richmond School of Law (J.D.)
- Occupation: Judge, Circuit Court

Claire G. Cardwell is a judge for the Thirteenth Judicial Circuit of Virginia in Richmond, Virginia.

== Early life and education ==
Cardwell earned her bachelor’s degree from the University of Virginia and later attended the University of Richmond School of Law, receiving a Juris Doctor.

== Career ==
Cardwell began her career as a lawyer in 1984. In 1989, Cardwell opened a private practice that focused on criminal defense and civil litigation and also began working as an adjunct professor at the University of Richmond. In 1994, Cardwell became Chief Deputy Commonwealth's Attorney in Richmond, Virginia. Cardwell later worked as the acting capital defender for the central region of the Virginia Indigent Defense Commission, defending those charged with capital murder. Cardwell served on the board of governors of the Virginia State Bar Criminal Law Section, the board of directors of the Virginia Capital Representation Resource Center, and the board of directors for the Richmond chapter of Housing Opportunities Made Equal.

In February 2013, Cardwell received the Carrico Professionalism Award from the Virginia State Bar Criminal Law Section.

In January 2017, Cardwell was elected to a six-year judgeship in the Richmond General District Court by the Virginia General Assembly. In November 2020, Cardwell was brought in as a special judge in Portsmouth, Virginia, to oversee a case in which the police department had filed charges against Virginia state senator Louise Lucas, Portsmouth Chief Public Defender Brenda Spry, and others who had been charged with felony destruction of a Confederate monument at a June 2020 protest. Cardwell dismissed the charges, and expressed concern that the Portsmouth Police had filed the charges without the approval of local prosecutors.

On August 16, 2021, Cardwell was elected to the Virginia Circuit Court in Richmond for an eight-year term which started on October 1, 2021.
