= Dillwyn Correctional Center =

Prison in Virginia, United States

Coordinates: 37°34′22″N 78°28′16″W

- Interactive map of Dillwyn Correctional Center
- Location: 1522 Prison Road Dillwyn, Virginia
- Status: Operational
- Security class: Security Level 2
- Capacity: 1106
- Population: 730 (June 2023)
- Opened: 1993
- Managed by: Virginia Department of Corrections
- Warden: Dana Ratliffe-Walker

Dillwyn Correctional Center is a state prison for men located in Dillwyn, Buckingham County, Virginia, United States. It is owned and operated by the Virginia Department of Corrections.

The facility was opened in 1993 and has a daily working population of 1,106 inmates, held at a range of security levels. The state's Buckingham Correctional Center is nearby. Dillwyn Correctional Center specializes in parole violators and also has a metal shop.

Piedmont Virginia Community College (PVCC) became the first college in Virginia to receive federal approval for its educational programs that benefit inmates at Dillwyn, Fluvanna Correctional Center for Women, and Buckingham Correctional Center.
