= State court magistrate judge =

Type of judge found in U.S. state courts

Magistrate judge, in U.S. state courts, is a title used for various kinds of judges, typically holding a low level of office with powers and responsibilities more limited than state court judges of general jurisdiction.

== County Magistrates in Georgia ==
In Georgia, each county has a chief magistrate, elected by the voters of the county, who has the authority to hold preliminary hearings in criminal cases, conduct bench trials for certain misdemeanor offenses, including deposit account fraud (bad checks), grant bail (except as to very serious felony charges), and preside over a small claims court for cases where the amount in controversy does not exceed $15,000. In some counties the chief magistrate may be authorized to appoint one or more additional magistrates to assist in carrying out the chief magistrate's duties. In some Georgia counties the Probate Court Judge also presides over magistrate court as Chief Magistrate. The enabling legislation does not require magistrates to be licensed attorneys and most Magistrates in Georgia are not required licensed attorneys, however, local legislation in certain counties requires that either the chief magistrate or all of the magistrates be licensed attorneys so some counties have both attorneys and non-attorneys on the magistrate court bench. The state also created a Georgia Magistrate Council to assist magistrates in understanding and carrying out their duties.

== County Magistrates in Kentucky ==
In many counties in Kentucky, Magistrates are elected every four years to the County's Fiscal Court. A Fiscal Court is led by an elected County Judge-Executive and is equivalent to a County Commission. A Kentucky County is separated into districts, and the citizens of each district elects a Magistrate to serve on this court. Under Kentucky's first constitution, Fiscal Courts were in charge of all judicial and legislative powers of a county. In the present constitution the Fiscal Court is only designated to carry out legislative powers, while the Judge-Executive carries out the executive powers of the county. In some counties in Kentucky, the magistrates no longer sit on the Fiscal Court, having been replaced by three at-large County Commissioners, along with the County Judge/Executive. In these counties, magistrates are still elected, however their duties are limited to the performance of marriage ceremonies.

== Magistrates in North Carolina ==
In North Carolina, magistrates are officers of District Court. Most magistrates are not lawyers. In criminal cases, a magistrate may issue warrants, set bail, accept guilty pleas, and so forth. In civil cases, the most common duty of a magistrate is to preside over small claims court. Decisions of a magistrate may be appealed to District Court for a trial de novo.

== Magistrates in Ohio ==
In Ohio, magistrates are appointed by the judges of many municipal courts, domestic relations and juvenile courts, and some courts of appeals and common pleas courts. In addition, to avoid any conflict of interest, most communities with mayor's courts have magistrates preside over sessions, rather than the mayors themselves. Ohio magistrates do virtually everything judges do. Their actions are subject to review and either approval, modification or reversal by judges of their court. The exception is mayor's court magistrates. Upon the timely notice of appeal from a conviction in a Mayor's Court, the proceeding before either the county or municipal court of the county in which the community is located is de novo.

== Magistrates in Pennsylvania ==
Pennsylvania has magisterial district judges, as well as the Philadelphia Arraignment Magistrates and Pittsburgh Municipal Magistrates. Magisterial district judges are elected for six-year terms by the electors in the district that the magistrate judge serves. They serve alone in districts apportioned by the Supreme Court of Pennsylvania and exercise statewide jurisdiction, with limitations. They conduct criminal arraignments and preliminary hearings, issue arrest warrants and search warrants in some cases, hear civil disputes involving $12,000 or less, landlord-tenant disputes (except matters involving title to real estate), issue temporary Protection from Abuse Act orders, decide traffic, game law, and fish and boat code cases, conduct marriages, and administer oaths and affirmations. They are state employees and supervise staff which are county employees.

Unlike judges in the county-level Courts of Common Pleas, or in the appellate courts, magistrates in Pennsylvania are not required to have law degrees.

== County Magistrates in South Carolina ==
In South Carolina, magistrates are appointed to four-year terms by the Governor upon the advice and consent of the Senate. However, according to a previous Governor of South Carolina, state senators largely control the process. Magistrates serve the county in which they are appointed and exercise county wide jurisdiction. They preside over civil and criminal cases, issue restraining orders, search and arrest warrants and conduct bond hearings (except as to a limited number of the most serious offenses such as murder), preliminary hearings, bench and jury trials. There are over 300 magistrates in the state, the majority of which have had no prior training in law. There are currently bills in the state Senate to reform how magistrates are chosen.

Magistrates have jurisdiction in civil cases when the amount in controversy does not exceed $7,500 per side (example: Plaintiff sues for $7500 and Defendant counterclaims for $7500), in traffic and criminal cases (offenses carry a penalty range from 1 day up to 3 years, although most are 30 days) and Landlord-Tenant cases with no limit on the dollar amount involved. Magistrates are referred to by the litigants and lawyers that appear before them as "Judge" or "Your Honor." The South Carolina Constitution guarantees defendants the right to a trial by jury on all criminal charges. Juries in Magistrate's Courts are composed of six citizens.

== Texas Magistrates ==
In Texas, all judges are magistrates, along with mayors of incorporated cities.

== See also ==
- United States magistrate judge
