= List of killings by law enforcement officers in the United States, September 2015 =

This is a list of people reported killed by non-military law enforcement officers in the United States in September 2015, whether in the line of duty or not, and regardless of reason or method. The listing documents the occurrence of a death, making no implications regarding wrongdoing or justification on the part of the person killed or officer involved. Killings are arranged by date of the incident that caused death. Different death dates, if known, are noted in the description. The table below lists 92 people.

== September 2015 ==
Date	Name (Age) of Deceased	Race	State (City)	Description
2015-09-30	Wesley Wayne Manning (40)	White	Texas (Rockport)	
2015-09-29	Robert Sullivan Christen (37)	White	Minnesota (Mora)	
2015-09-29	Patrick Stephen Lundstrom (46)	Native American	South Dakota (Rapid City)	
2015-09-29	Brandon Lamar Johnson (28)	Black	West Virginia (Beckley)	Johnson, who was wanted for a murder in Rockdale County, Georgia, was spotted by police driving a blue Dodge Intrepid at a high speed on Interstate 77. After the car was stopped using spike strips, police say Johnson got out of the car and pointed a gun at the troopers, who responded to the threat by firing their weapons. Jones died at a Beckley hospital.
2015-09-28	Alberto Hernandez (59)	Hispanic	California (San Diego)	San Diego Police officers responded to a 911 call from a man who said he wanted to shoot a woman before the call was disconnected. When police arrived at the door they encountered a man holding a gun. Officers retreated down the stairs but the man followed them, pointing the gun at them. Three officers opened fire and the man was killed. The gun turned out to be a replica and the woman in the apartment was not injured.
2015-09-27	Norma Angelica Guzman (37)	Hispanic	California (Los Angeles)	Los Angeles Police responded to a report of a woman with a knife. During their encounter, one or more officers shot and killed Norma Guzman.
2015-09-26	Kylie Lindsey (17)	White	Georgia (Carrollton)	Kylie Lindsey and Isabella Chinchilla were killed in a motor vehicle crash involving now former Georgia State Patrol Trooper A.J. Scott. Trooper Scott was not on a call and was traveling over 90mph (35mph over the 55mph speed limit) seconds before the crash with no lights or siren. Trooper Scott was subsequently fired by the Georgia State Patrol. He was cleared of wrongdoing by a Carroll County grand jury on February 17, 2016.
2015-09-26	Isabella Chinchilla (16)	White	Georgia (Carrollton)	Kylie Lindsey and Isabella Chinchilla were killed in a motor vehicle crash involving now former Georgia State Patrol Trooper A.J. Scott. Trooper Scott was not on a call and was traveling over 90mph (35mph over the 55mph speed limit) seconds before the crash with no lights or siren. Trooper Scott was subsequently fired by the Georgia State Patrol. He was cleared of wrongdoing by a Carroll County grand jury on February 17, 2016.
2015-09-23	Jeremy McDole (28)	Black	Delaware (Wilmington)	Jeremy McDole was shot by Wilmington Police. He was reported to have a gun while he was sitting in his wheelchair.
2015-09-22	Dante Osborne (32)	Black	California (San Leandro)	Dante Osborne was wanted in connection with a drive-by shooting earlier that day. Alameda County Sheriffs deputies spotted him driving on Interstate 580 and tried to stop him. He drove off the freeway, abandoned his vehicle, and fled on foot. Deputies pursued him and he was killed in an exchange of gunfire with the deputies.
2015-09-22	Tim Kyle Torngren (55)	White	California (Anderson)	Shasta County Sheriffs Deputies were sent on a welfare check of Torngren who had sent a suicidal letter to his daughter. Deputies report that when they arrived at the residence in the community of Happy Valley, Torngren was armed with a handgun and a rifle. Several shots were fired and Torngren was killed. None of the deputies were injured.
2015-09-21	Spaits, William (27)	White	California (Sand City)	Williams Spaits and Tina Money were wanted on no-bail warrants when they were shopping in Sand City. Store security had detected their use of a stolen credit card and called police. Sand City Police officers found Spaits and Money as they were about to get into a car. In the confrontation that followed both sides fired shots. Spaits and Money were killed and two officers were wounded.
2015-09-21	Money, Tina (23)	White	California (Sand City)	Williams Spaits and Tina Money were wanted on no-bail warrants when they were shopping in Sand City. Store security had detected their use of a stolen credit card and called police. Sand City Police officers found Spaits and Money as they were about to get into a car. In the confrontation that followed both sides fired shots. Spaits and Money were killed and two officers were wounded.
2015-09-18	Johnson, Nicholas Alan (32)	White	California (San Bernardino)	San Bernardino County Sheriffs deputies attempted to arrest a home invasion suspect and he fled, leading to a high-speed chase with the suspect travelling the wrong way on Interstate 215. An officer armed with a rifle in a sheriffs helicopter shot the fleeing suspect, which led to a crash on the freeway. The suspect exited his vehicle and died. Three people in the vehicle he struck were hospitalized.
2015-09-18	Lacy, Cecil D. (50)	Native American	Washington (Snohomish County)	Lacy, a member of the Tulalip Tribes, was walking intoxicated in the middle of the road in darkness. The attempt of police officers to bring him home safely ended in the use of an electronic stun gun and the subsequent collapse and death of Lacy.
2015-09-16	Wilhelm, Carlos Joseph (39)	Hispanic	California (Los Angeles)	As Los Angeles Police officers responded to reports of gunshots at a home, an officer in a police helicopter saw a man with a rifle in front of the home and advised the officers on the ground. As the officers approached Wilhelm "engaged" with the officers. They shot and fatally wounded him. The body of a dead woman was found in the home. Wilhelm died later at a hospital.
2015-09-15	Chaidez, Florencio (32)	Hispanic	California (Los Angeles)	Los Angeles Police officers, responding to a report of a man wearing beige clothing and carrying a gun. About 30 minutes later and one-half mile away the officers spotted a man similarly dressed. A police spokesman says the man "presented a handgun." An area resident reported hearing three shots. The suspect was killed and a handgun was on the ground near his body.
2015-09-14	Powell, David (28)	White	California (Barstow)	Barstow Police responded to reported assaults at the same house three times in one evening. On the third visit officers encountered the subject in the back yard and there was a struggle. The officers shot and killed David Powell.
2015-09-10	Tapia, Eddie (41)	Hispanic	California (Downey)	A man holding hostages at gunpoint in a diner was shot as law enforcement officers freed the hostages.
2015-09-10	Tian Ma (31)	Asian	New York (Potsdam)	Ma, a 31-year-old student at Clarkson University, stabbed a fellow student to death at an apartment complex. He was fatally shot by a Potsdam police officer when he refused orders to drop the knife.
2015-09-10	Austin Wilburly Reid (32)	White	California (Lodi)	Officers from the Lodi Police Special Investigations Unit were seeking Reid in connection with a parole violation and a previous shooting. When police encountered him near a McDonald's restaurant he ran, exchanging gunfire with the detectives. Police shot and killed Reid.
2015-09-10	Santino Burce (35)	Hispanic	California (Fontana)	A Fontana Police officer was checking on a pedestrian at 11:30 a.m. when the man pulled a knife. The officer shot Santino Burce, who died at a hospital.
2015-09-09	William Chau (59)	Asian	California (El Monte)	El Monte Police officers responded to a call about a house fire to find Chau holding a knife to a woman. Both had visible burns. When Chau did not drop the knife as ordered, the officer shot him. As the police investigated they found another woman and another man, both with burns and stab wounds. Chau and both women (his wife and mother-in-law) died.
2015-09-07	Casimero “Shane” Carlos Casillas (45)	Hispanic	California (Fresno)	After Casillas had fled from a traffic stop, Fresno Police officers found him in the backyard of a home, holding a two-foot long piece of pipe. When he ran toward them, one of the officers shot him in the chest. Casillas died in a local hospital. In March 2019 a federal jury awarded $4.75 million to Casillas' family in their lawsuit against the City of Fresno
2015-09-06	de Baca, Ben Anthony C (47)		New Mexico (Rio Rancho)	de Baca died after being restrained by officers who had been called to a Walmart where de Baca was behaving erratically. Bodycam footage showed two of the officers fist-bumping as de Baca was restrained.
2015-09-28	Junior Prosper (31)	Black	Florida (Miami)	
2015-09-27	Christopher Shell (43)	White	Georgia (Rossville)	
2015-09-27	Victor Oswaldo Coronado-Martinez (40)	Hispanic	Texas (Ponder)	
2015-09-26	Alejandro Lerma (23)	Hispanic	New Mexico (Lovington)	
2015-09-26	Anthony McKinney (46)	Black	Louisiana (Baton Rouge)	
2015-09-25	James Anderson (33)	Black	Illinois (Chicago)	
2015-09-25	Jeffrey Blood (45)	White	Arizona (Wilhoit)	
2015-09-25	Freddy Centeno (40)	Hispanic	California (Fresno)	
2015-09-25	William R. Lemmon (21)	White	Ohio (Akron)	
2015-09-24	Patrick O'Grady (17)	White	Colorado (Fountain)	
2015-09-24	Ernesto Medina López (42)	Black	Florida (Miami)	
2015-09-24	Philip Quinn (30)	Native American	Minnesota (St Paul)	
2015-09-23	Joseph Khammash (35)	White	Texas (McKinney)	
2015-09-23	Robert Richard Berger (48)	Black	Utah (Salt Lake City)	
2015-09-23	Kenneth Ray Pinter Jr. (45)	White	Virginia (Troutdale)	
2015-09-23	Keith Harrison McLeod (19)	Black	Maryland (Reisterstown)	
2015-09-22	Donaven Kyle Anderson (26)	White	Nevada (North Las Vegas)	
2015-09-22	Joel Dixon Smith (33)	White	Florida (Niceville)	
2015-09-21	Gerardo Ramirez (24)	Hispanic	Texas (Dallas)	
2015-09-21	Garrett Steven McKinney (21)	White	Texas (Paris)	
2015-09-21	Timothy Wagner (26)	White	Florida (Barberville)	
2015-09-21	Dominic Fuller (34)	Hispanic	Florida (Auburndale)	
2015-09-20	Jerrald Wright (56)	White	Indiana (Shelbyville)	
2015-09-20	Michael Thomas Pierce (23)	White	Virginia (Harrisonburg)	
2015-09-19	Lucien Rolland (46)	White	Louisiana (Slidell)	
2015-09-18	Gregory Herrell (47)	White	Tennessee (Cumberland Furnace)	
2015-09-18	Scott Beech (57)	White	Alabama (St. Stephens)	
2015-09-17	Lawrence R. Price (61)	White	Kentucky (Brodhead)	
2015-09-17	Mark R. Gary (50)	White	Michigan (Beaverton)	
2015-09-16	Rory Lynn Gunderman (31)	White	South Dakota (Lead)	
2015-09-15	Bobby R. Anderson (27)	Black	Louisiana (Alexandria)	
2015-09-15	Tyrone Bass (21)	Black	Louisiana (Chalmette)	
2015-09-15	Jorge Suarez-Ruiz (51)	Hispanic	Florida (Miami)	
2015-09-14	Joseph Thomas Johnson-Shanks (25)	Black	Kentucky (Eddyville)	
2015-09-13	Martin Francis Hammen (39)	White	Iowa (Wellman)	
2015-09-13	Jeffrey Eugene Brooks (29)	White	Texas (Clute)	
2015-09-13	Clifford Butler Jr. (67)	Black	Oklahoma (Pond Creek)	
2015-09-12	Derek Davis (23)	White	Alabama (Sylacauga)	
2015-09-12	Jack Allen Stevens Jr. (45)	White	Tennessee (Knoxville)	
2015-09-11	Robert Edwards (31)	White	Pennsylvania (Chester)	
2015-09-11	Phillip Pfleghardt (44)	White	Colorado (Broomfield)	
2015-09-10	Brandon Foy (29)	Black	Indiana (Indianapolis)	
2015-09-09	Tyrone L. Holman (37)	Black	Missouri (Kansas City)	
2015-09-09	Vincent Perdue (33)	Native American	Alaska (North Pole)	
2015-09-09	Dustin M. Kuik (25)	White	Wisconsin (Green Bay)	
2015-09-08	Tristan Vent (19)	Native American	Alaska (Fairbanks)	
2015-09-07	Gunner Wayne Page (1)	White	Tennessee (Puryear)	
2015-09-07	Wayne Wheeler (41)	Black	Michigan (Detroit)	
2015-09-06	William Verrett (45)	White	New Mexico (Hobbs)	
2015-09-06	Mohamed Ibrahim (28)	Asian	Louisiana (Shreveport)	
2015-09-06	Carlos Yero (59)	Hispanic	Florida (Miami)	
2015-09-05	La'vante Trevon Biggs (21)	Black	North Carolina (Durham)	
2015-09-04	Jose Ramon Damiani Jr. (49)	Hispanic	Indiana (French Lick)	
2015-09-04	Curtis James Meyer (37)	Asian	South Dakota (Mitchell)	
2015-09-04	Lucas Markus (33)	White	Pennsylvania (Girardville)	
2015-09-04	Harrison Lambert (23)	White	New Hampshire (Merrimack)	
2015-09-04	Sully Joe Lanier (36)	White	Texas (Springtown)	
2015-09-02	Arthur Edward Bates (45)	White	Arizona (Prescott)	
2015-09-05	Angelo Delano Perry (35)	Black	Virginia (Virginia Beach)	Angelo Perry, a Reggae artist from Atlanta, Georgia was killed by the Virginia Beach Police SWAT team during a planned "take down" operation targeted at Mr. Perry. Sixteen VBPD SWAT officers surveilled Mr. Perry in the passenger seat of the vehicle driven by India Kager, a Navy Veteran and resident of Maryland for several hours during visits with family in the Virginia Beach area. The VBPD SWAT officers then performed a high risk vehicle take-down where a flash-bang was utilized while SWAT officers approached the vehicle. Perry opened fire on the SWAT officers striking the uniform of one. SWAT officers returned fire striking Perry and the driver, India Kager. Ms. Kager's 4 month-old son was in the back seat of her vehicle. India Kager and Angelo Perry were killed while the infant survived the attack. VBPD released a narrative stating that Mr. Perry was a person of "interest", however, there was no active warrant out for his arrest but that the department had actionable intelligence that Perry was on his way to carry out a "hit" on a rival drug dealer. VBPD Police Chief, Jim Cervera publicly admitted that India Kager was not the subject of any investigation and claimed that her killing was "accidental and not intended". Colin Stolle, the Virginia Beach Commonwealth Attorney chose not to criminally charge the four officers who fired into Ms. Kager's vehicle. The shootings were later ruled to be justified solely by Colin Stolle.
2015-09-05	India Kager (28)	Black	Virginia (Virginia Beach)	India Kager, a resident of College Park, Maryland was a mother and Navy Vet killed by the Virginia Beach Police SWAT team during a planned "take down" operation targeted at Angelo Perry. Sixteen VBPD SWAT officers surveilled Ms. Kager operating her vehicle for hours before performing a high-risk vehicle take-down where a flash-bang was utilized while SWAT officers approached the vehicle. Perry retrieved a loaded firearm by his feet and opened fire on the SWAT officers striking the uniform of one. Ms. Kager's 4 month-old son was in the back seat of her vehicle and Angelo Perry was in the passenger seat. In less than nine seconds, India Kager and Angelo Perry were killed while the infant survived the attack. VBPD released a narrative stating that Mr. Perry was a person of "interest", however, there was no active warrant out for his arrest, but that the department had actionable intelligence that Perry was on his way to carry out a "hit" on a rival drug dealer. VBPD Police Chief, Jim Cervera admitted that India Kager was not the subject of any investigation and claimed that her killing was "accidental and not intended" although witnesses from a prior drive-by murder committed in the weeks leading up to this fatal encounter stated Perry fled the scene in the same vehicle being operated by a female. Colin Stolle, the Virginia Beach Commonwealth Attorney chose not to criminally charge the four officers who fired into Ms. Kager's vehicle. The shootings were later ruled to be justified solely by Colin Stolle.
2015-09-05	Manuel Ornelas (47)	Hispanic	California (Long Beach)	Long Beach Police officers responded to a call from a home where Ornelas was reported to be under the influence of narcotics and acting violently. In their attempts to subdue him they used "an electronic control device" and a "cartoid restraint." Once Ornelas was subdued, he went into cardiac arrest and was pronounced dead at a hospital.
2015-09-05	Luis Guillen Wenceslao (32)	Hispanic	California (Ontario)	Officers from the Ontario Police Department responded to a domestic violence call. When they arrived at the residence, Wenceslao, holding a metal pipe, charged at the officers. They shot and killed him.
2015-09-04	Richard Keith Kelley (27)	White	California (Weitchpec)	Kelley, on a stolen motorcycle, was being pursued by a Hoopa Valley Tribal Police Officer. Kelley fired at the officer and the officer returned fire, killing Kelley. The District Attorney decided that no charges should be filed against the officer.
2015-09-03	Centeno, Freddy (40)		California (Fresno)	Freddy Centeno was shot seven times by two Fresno Police officers about 11 AM on September 3, 2015. They were responding to a 911 call reporting a man with a gun. They found Centeno walking on the street. Police say when they told him to show his hands and get on the ground he pulled a "pistol-looking object" from his waistband. The officers fired nine times, striking Centeno seven times. The object turned out to be water sprayer. He was taken to a local hospital and died on September 26, 2015. His brother Roger Centeno said that he was bipolar, schizophrenic, and abused drugs. Freddy Centeno had had previous contact with the police relating to his mental health and drug abuse. The family has filed a lawsuit against the Fresno Police Department.
2015-09-01	Cedric Maurice Williams (33)	Black	West Virginia (Bluefield)	
2015-09-01	Charles Robert Shaw (76)	White	Ohio (Twinsburg)	
2015-09-01	Michael Todd Evans (47)	White	New Mexico (Artesia)	

== See also ==
- Death in custody § United States
- Henry A. Wallace Police Crime Public Database
- List of cases of police brutality
- List of countries with annual rates and counts for killings by law enforcement officers
- List of law enforcement officers killed in the line of duty in the United States
- List of law enforcement officers convicted for an on-duty killing in the United States
- List of shootings by US immigration agents
- List of police reforms related to the George Floyd protests
- List of unarmed African Americans killed by law enforcement officers in the United States
- Lists of killings by law enforcement officers
- Police brutality in the United States
- Police misconduct § United States
- Police riot § United States
- Police use of deadly force in the United States
