= Geoffrey Alpert =

American criminology professor (born 1948)

Geoffrey Philip Alpert
- Born: June 5, 1948 (age 78)
- Education: University of Oregon, University of Oregon School of Law, Washington State University
- Children: 4
- Awards: 1992 Police Development and Training Fellowship from the German Marshall Fund, 2009 Bruce Smith Award for Outstanding Contributions to Criminal Justice from the Academy of Criminal Justice Sciences, 2012 University of South Carolina Russell Research Award for Outstanding Research and Scholarship
- Scientific career
- Fields: Criminology
- Workplaces: University of Miami, University of South Carolina
- Thesis: Legal problems of prison inmates: a review and analysis (1975)

Geoffrey Philip Alpert is a professor in the Department of Criminology and Criminal Justice at the University of South Carolina.

== Education ==
Alpert received his B.A. and M.A. from the University of Oregon in 1969 and 1970, respectively. For one year (1974-1975) he attended the University of Oregon School of Law. In 1975, he received his Ph.D. from Washington State University.

== Career ==
Alpert served as assistant professor of sociology and public administration at the University of Colorado, Colorado Springs from 1978 to 1979. He served as an associate professor of sociology at the University of Miami from 1981 to 1985, and a full professor there from 1985 until becoming a professor at the University of South Carolina in August 1988.

== Research and views ==
Alpert is an expert on police use of force. He has said that the United States Department of Justice's agreement with the Cleveland Division of Police was the only such agreement he knew of that required the city's police department to boost its resources. He has also said that one of the most important aspects of the DOJ's agreement with the New Orleans Police Department was that it was the first to include outcome measures to determine whether the city had fulfilled its requirements under the agreement. In 2015, he told the Wall Street Journal that when police departments are in dire straits, they often decide to fire their chief. He added that, with regard to this decision, "It could be the sacrificial lamb or it could be the necessary change," and that the firing of Chicago Police Department superintendent Garry McCarthy was an example of the former. He has said that the shooting of Jeremy McDole was "relatively new and rare" because the officer who shot McDole was arrested and charged with depriving McDole of rights "under color of law".
