= Killing of Freddie Gray =

2015 death in custody of Baltimore Police

- Undated picture of Gray
- Date: April 12, 2015; 11 years ago (incident); April 19, 2015; 11 years ago (Gray's death)
- Location: Baltimore, Maryland, U.S.
- Type: Homicide, police killing
- Cause: Spinal cord injury
- Filmed by: Two witnesses to Gray's arrest, store video of police van
- Participants: Freddie C. Gray, six Baltimore police officers
- Burial: April 27, 2015
- Inquiries: U.S. Department of Justice; Baltimore Police Department
- Accused: Caesar R. Goodson Jr.; William G. Porter; Brian W. Rice; Edward M. Nero; Garrett Miller; Alicia D. White
- Charges: Goodson: Second-degree depraved-heart murder; Others: Involuntary manslaughter; Second-degree assault; Manslaughter by vehicle; Misconduct in office; Reckless endangerment; False imprisonment
- Verdict: Goodson, Nero, Rice: Not guilty; Porter: Mistrial followed by charges being dropped; Miller, White: Charges dropped
- Litigation: The City of Baltimore settled at $6.4 million prior to the Gray's family filing to sue

On April 12, 2015, Freddie Carlos Gray Jr., a 25-year-old African-American, was arrested by the Baltimore Police Department for possession of a knife. While in police custody, Gray sustained fatal injuries and was taken to the R Adams Cowley Shock Trauma Center. Gray's death on April 19, 2015, was ascribed to injuries to his cervical spinal cord.

Pending an investigation of the incident, six Baltimore police officers were suspended. Commissioner Anthony W. Batts reported that officers had not secured Gray inside the van while driving to the police station, contrary to a policy that had been put into effect six days prior to Gray's arrest. The medical examiner's office concluded that Gray's death could not be ruled an accident, and was instead a homicide, because officers failed to follow safety procedures. Baltimore City State's Attorney, Marilyn Mosby announced her office had filed charges against six police officers after the medical examiner's report ruled Gray's death a homicide.

Prosecutors found probable cause to file criminal charges against the six police officers who were believed to be involved in his death. The officer driving the van was charged with second-degree depraved-heart murder for his indifference to the considerable risk that Gray might be killed, and others were charged with crimes ranging from manslaughter to illegal arrest. A grand jury indicted the officers on most of the original charges filed by Mosby with the exception of the charges of illegal imprisonment and false arrest, and added charges of reckless endangerment to all the officers involved.

Gray's hospitalization and subsequent death resulted in a series of protests. A major protest in downtown Baltimore turned violent, resulting in 34 arrests and injuries to 15 police officers. After Gray's funeral, civil disorder intensified with looting and burning of local businesses and a CVS drug store, culminating with a state of emergency declaration by Governor Larry Hogan, Maryland National Guard deployment to Baltimore, and the establishment of a curfew. On May 3, the National Guard began withdrawing from Baltimore, and that night the city's curfew was lifted.

In September 2015, it was decided that there would be separate trials for the accused. The trial against Officer William Porter ended in a mistrial. Officers Nero, Goodson, and Rice were acquitted. The charges against the two remaining officers were dropped.

On September 12, 2017, after a two-year investigation, the U.S. Department of Justice announced that it would not bring federal charges against the six Baltimore police officers involved in the arrest and death in custody of Gray, finding that the evidence was "insufficient to prove beyond a reasonable doubt" that the officers "willfully violated Gray's civil rights".

== Backgrounds ==
=== Freddie Gray ===
Freddie Carlos Gray Jr. (August 16, 1989 – April 19, 2015) was the 25-year-old son of Gloria Darden. He had a twin sister, Fredericka Gray, as well as another sister, Carolina. As a child, Gray suffered from damaging levels of lead poisoning while living in a peeling rental home in the Sandtown-Winchester neighborhood in West Baltimore between 1991 and 1993. Medical records showed his blood lead levels tested as high as 37 μg/dL, well above the level of toxicity. He was diagnosed with attention deficit hyperactivity disorder after entering school, where he attended special education classes, and played wide receiver in a local football little league team. Gray was a truant student and failed several grades and dropped out of high school in ninth grade. In 2008, Gray and his siblings successfully sued their former landlord of his childhood home for the resulting brain damage they suffered and led to educational and medical deficits. However, in 2013, Gray sold his future settlement payments totaling $146,000 to Access Funding, a structured settlement factoring company, for a lump sum payment of $18,000. A 2016 article by The Washington Post exposing the settlement purchase prompted the Maryland Attorney General's office to launch an investigation with the state's legislative branch proposing reform of the practice.

At the time of his death, Gray lived in the home owned by his sisters on East Lorraine Avenue in the Charles Village neighborhood of Baltimore. He stood 5 feet 8 inches (1.73 m) and weighed 145 pounds (66 kg). Gray had a criminal record with 18 prior arrests, on drug charges, three separate assault charges, and minor crimes and had spent time in jail.

=== Police officers ===
- Officer Caesar R. Goodson Jr., age 45, then a 16-year veteran of the police force.
- Officer Garrett E. Miller, age 26, joined the Baltimore Police Department in 2012.
- Officer Edward M. Nero, age 29, joined the Baltimore Police Department in 2012.
- Officer William G. Porter, age 25, joined the police force in 2012.
- Lieutenant Brian W. Rice, age 41, then a 17-year veteran of the force. Rice, who was promoted to lieutenant in 2011, is the highest-ranking officer charged in relation to Gray's death. The Guardian reported that, in 2012, Rice had allegedly threatened to kill himself and the husband of his former partner. He had been hospitalized, reportedly, for a mental health evaluation and given an administrative suspension. The consequences of this threat included Rice having his guns confiscated and a restraining order on behalf of the husband of his former partner. According to a police report obtained by The Guardian, Rice had also misused his position to order the arrest of his ex-girlfriend's husband as part of a personal dispute that took place two weeks before the incident. Rice's record with the police Internal Affairs Division consisted of thirty-two complaints, two of which were sustained cases: a 1998 incident involving drug evidence left in his car, and a 2012 incident where he sent sexual images to his former partner using his departmental cell phone.
- Sergeant Alicia D. White, age 30, joined the force in 2010 and was promoted to sergeant three months prior to Gray's death. She grew up in Baltimore.

== Arrest and death ==
Timeline of Freddie Gray's arrest

Police encountered Freddie Gray on the morning of April 12, 2015, in the street near Baltimore's Gilmor Homes housing project, an area known to have high levels of home foreclosures, poverty, drug deals, and violent crime. Approximately three weeks prior to the incident, Mosby had requested "enhanced" drug enforcement efforts at the corner of North and Mount. According to the charging documents submitted by the Baltimore police, at 8:39 a.m Lieutenant Brian W. Rice, Officer Edward Nero, and Officer Garrett E. Miller were patrolling on bicycles and made eye contact with Gray, who proceeded to flee on foot "unprovoked upon noticing police presence". After a brief chase, Gray was apprehended and taken into custody "without the use of force or incident", according to Officer Garrett Miller, who wrote he "noticed a knife clipped to the inside of his [Gray's] front right pocket". In the formal statement of charges, Officer Miller stated that Gray "did unlawfully carry, possess, and sell a knife commonly known as a switch blade knife, with an automatic spring or other device for opening and/or closing the blade within the limits of Baltimore City. The knife was recovered by this officer and found to be a spring assisted one hand operated knife." According to the state's attorney for Baltimore City, the spring-assisted knife Gray was carrying was legal under Maryland law, while a police task force said the knife was a violation of the Baltimore code under which Gray was charged.

Video recordings by two bystanders capturing Gray's arrest showed Gray, screaming, being dragged to a police van by officers, and then stepping up into the van. A bystander with connections to Gray stated that the officers were previously "folding" Gray: one officer bent Gray's legs backward, and another held Gray down by pressing a knee into his neck. Witnesses commented Gray "couldn't walk", "can't use his legs". Baltimore Police Commissioner Anthony W. Batts noted from the video that "Gray stood on one leg and climbed into the van on his own." The Baltimore Sun reported that another witness saw Gray being beaten with police batons.

According to the police timeline, Gray was placed in a transport van within 11 minutes of his arrest, and within 30 minutes, paramedics were summoned to take Gray to a hospital. The van made four confirmed stops while Gray was detained. At 8:46 am, Gray was unloaded in order to be placed in leg irons because police said he was acting irate. Gray's shackling was recorded on a cellphone, which exhibited a motionless Gray surrounded by several officers as he was restrained. A later stop, recorded by a private security camera, shows the van stopped at a grocery store. At 8:59 am, a second prisoner was placed in the vehicle while officers checked on Gray's condition. At 9:24 am, the transport van arrived at its final stop, the West District police station. After paramedics treated Gray for 21 minutes, he was taken to the University of Maryland's R Adams Cowley Shock Trauma Center at 9:45 am in a coma.

The media has suggested the possibility of a rough ride—a form of police brutality where a handcuffed prisoner is placed without a seatbelt in an erratically driven vehicle—as a contributing factor in Gray's injury. During Officer Goodson's trial, a prosecution witness testified that he "could not say" if there had been a rough ride, and the judge ruled that the prosecution had not presented evidence to back that assumption. Moreover, and as noted by the BBC in December 2015, "Throughout the trial, the prosecution insisted that Mr Porter could have saved Gray's life by restraining him and by calling for medical help after his injury. They described the police van as a coffin on wheels."

In June 2016, the Baltimore Sun noted that Dr. Carol Allan, an assistant medical examiner, "testified that Gray's fatal neck injuries, resembling those suffered in a diving accident, were caused by abrupt force to his neck during his transport, when he could not see outside the van to predict sudden stops, starts or turns."

The department's seatbelt policy had been revised six days prior to Gray's arrest, in an attempt to protect detained individuals from serious injuries during transport. The policy was not followed in Gray's case. According to attorney Michael Davey, who represents at least one of the officers under investigation, the new rules were criticized by some. He explained that in certain situations, like when a prisoner is combative, "It is not always possible or safe for officers to enter the rear of those transport vans that are very small, and this one was very small."

In the following week, according to the Gray family attorney, Gray suffered from total cardiopulmonary arrest at least once but was resuscitated without ever regaining consciousness. He remained in a coma and underwent extensive surgery in an effort to save his life. According to his family, he lapsed into a coma with three fractured vertebrae, injuries to his voice box, and his spine 80% severed at his neck. Police confirmed that the spinal injury led to Gray's death. Gray died on April 19, 2015, a week after his arrest.

== Aftermath ==
=== Investigation ===
The Baltimore Police Department suspended six officers with pay pending an investigation of Gray's death. The six officers involved in the arrest were identified as Lieutenant Brian Rice, Sergeant Alicia White, Officer William Porter, Officer Garrett Miller, Officer Edward Nero, and Officer Caesar Goodson. On April 24, 2015, Police Commissioner Anthony Batts said, "We know our police employees failed to get him medical attention in a timely manner multiple times." Batts also acknowledged police did not follow procedure when they failed to buckle Gray in the van while he was being transported to the police station. The U.S. Department of Justice also opened an investigation into the case.

On April 30, 2015, Kevin Moore, one of the witnesses who filmed Gray's arrest, was arrested at gunpoint following what Moore described as "harassment and intimidation" by police. Moore stated he had cooperated with police and had given over his video of Gray's arrest for investigation. He claimed, despite aiding in the investigation, his photo was made public by police, who asked the public to identify him because he was "wanted for questioning". Moore said the police obviously knew who he was when they posted his photo. Moore was released from custody the next day, but two other individuals who were arrested along with Moore remained in custody. The same day as Moore's arrest, medical examiners reported Gray sustained more injuries as a result of slamming into the inside of the transport van, "apparently breaking his neck; a head injury he sustained matches a bolt in the back of the van".

On May 19, 2015, prosecutors asked a judge to issue a gag order on attorneys, police, and witnesses to the arrest, arguing that statements by some of the officers' attorneys could prejudice the public. On June 8, 2015, it was announced that a judge had denied the state's attorney's request for a gag order on procedural grounds.

=== Charges, indictments, and trials ===
On May 1, 2015, after receiving a medical examiner's report ruling Gray's death a homicide, state prosecutors said that they had probable cause to file criminal charges against the six officers involved. State's attorney Marilyn Mosby said that the Baltimore police had acted illegally and that "No crime had been committed" (by Freddie Gray). Mosby said that Gray "suffered a critical neck injury as a result of being handcuffed, shackled by his feet and unrestrained inside the BPD wagon". Mosby said officers had "failed to establish probable cause for Mr. Gray's arrest, as no crime had been committed", and charged officers with false imprisonment, because Gray was carrying a pocket knife of legal size, and not the switchblade police claimed he had possessed at the time of his arrest. All six officers were taken into custody and processed at Baltimore Central Booking and Intake Center.

Three of the officers faced manslaughter charges, and one faced an additional count of second-degree depraved-heart murder. The murder charge carries a possible penalty of 30 years in prison; the manslaughter and assault offenses carry a maximum penalty of 10 years in prison. All six officers were released from jail after posting bail the same day they were booked. Two officers were released on $250,000 bail and the four others' bail was $350,000.

Baltimore police officers charged in the death of Freddie Gray. Top row left to right: Caesar R. Goodson Jr., Garrett E. Miller, and Edward M. Nero. Bottom row left to right: William G. Porter, Brian W. Rice, and Alicia D. White

On September 2, 2015, it was decided to hold separate trials for the accused. In December 2015, Baltimore judge Barry Williams declared a mistrial in the trial of Officer Porter after the jury was unable to reach a verdict.

In May 2016, Judge Williams found Nero not guilty following a bench trial. On June 23, 2016, Officer Goodson was acquitted of all charges by Circuit Judge Barry Williams. In June 2016, law professor John Banzhaf of George Washington University filed a complaint with the bar against Marilyn Mosby for prosecutorial misconduct.

In January 2017, a federal judge allowed a lawsuit by five of the six police officers unsuccessfully charged by Mosby. Mosby was being sued for malicious prosecution, defamation, and invasion of privacy. The Fourth Circuit Court of Appeals blocked the lawsuit on the grounds that Mosby had immunity from such charges in May 2018, and the U.S. Supreme Court denied the officers' appeal in November 2018.

==== Response to charges ====
Mayor Stephanie Rawlings-Blake said there was no place in the Baltimore Police department for those police officers who "choose to engage in violence, brutality, [and] racism". Gene Ryan, president of the police union chapter, said that despite the tragic situation, "none of the officers involved are responsible for the death of Mr. Gray." President Barack Obama said it was vital that the truth be found and supported protests if they were peaceful.

In a May 4, 2015, interview on Fox News, Alan Dershowitz said he believed Mosby overcharged the officers to appease protesters and prevent further disturbances. Former Baltimore Prosecutor Page Croyder wrote an op-ed in The Baltimore Sun where she described Mosby's charges as reflecting "either incompetence or an unethical recklessness". Croyder opined that Mosby circumvented normal procedures "to step into the national limelight", and that she "pandered to the public", creating an expectation of a conviction.

A motion for Mosby to recuse herself from the case was filed on behalf of the charged officers, on the alleged basis of personal gain by Mosby and her husband, relationships with potential witnesses, and the financial interest of Gray's attorney, who the motion claims is a close friend of Mosby. CNN's legal analyst Jeffrey Toobin pointed out that he does not see any serious conflict of interest to disqualify Mosby from the case, and that the officers may not have a case with that motion. The lawyers representing the officers filed a motion insisting that the city must pay thousands of dollars in damages for arresting and detaining them—or else they could sue Mosby and the Mayor of Baltimore, Stephanie Rawlings-Blake. In an 11-page rebuttal, Chief Deputy State's Attorney Michael Schatzow wrote that Gray was detained "well before the arresting officers knew he possessed a knife" and that the motion was absurdly "bounc[ing] from one ridiculous allegation to another, like a pinball on a machine far past 'TILT'". Mosby was ordered to respond to the motion filed by the defense attorneys by June 26, 2015.

==== Officer William G. Porter ====
Porter met up with the van after Goodson called dispatchers to ask for an officer to come check on Gray. He was requested twice by Gray for a medic, but did not call for one. He was charged with involuntary manslaughter; second-degree assault; and misconduct in office. Porter posted a $350,000 bail. The grand jury indicted Porter on all charges and added an indictment of reckless endangerment. On December 16, 2015, a mistrial was declared on all charges, after the jury was hung and could not come to a decision. Porter's second trial was scheduled for June 13, 2016. Analysts stated that the Porter's retrial could have caused problems for the other trials, under the presumption that he could not be compelled to testify while there are pending charges against him. After several appeals and reversals, the Maryland Court of Appeals ruled that Porter would be required to testify in the cases against the other officers. Porter's retrial date was originally scheduled for September 6, 2016. On July 27, 2016, all charges against him were dropped.

==== Officer Caesar R. Goodson Jr. ====
Goodson, the driver of the van, was charged with second-degree depraved-heart murder; involuntary manslaughter; second-degree assault; manslaughter by vehicle (gross negligence); manslaughter by vehicle (criminal negligence); and misconduct in office. He posted a $350,000 bail. The grand jury indicted Goodson on all charges and added an indictment of reckless endangerment. Goodson was found not guilty on all charges by Circuit Judge Barry Williams on June 23, 2016.

==== Officers Garrett E. Miller and Edward M. Nero ====
Miller and Nero were the officers who caught Gray after he fled, and, after apprehending him, handcuffed Gray with his arms behind his back. Miller was charged with two counts of second-degree assault; two counts of misconduct in office; and false imprisonment. Nero was charged with two counts of second-degree assault; misconduct in office; and false imprisonment. Each posted a $250,000 bail. The false imprisonment charges were dropped by the grand jury, but an indictment of reckless endangerment was added. Judge Williams found Nero not guilty of all charges on May 23, 2016. Miller's trial date was set for July 27, 2016. At his pretrial hearing on July 27, 2016, however, all charges against Miller, Porter, and White were dropped.

==== Lt. Brian W. Rice ====
Rice was the officer who first made eye contact with Gray during a bicycle patrol. He was charged with involuntary manslaughter; two counts of second-degree assault; manslaughter by vehicle (gross negligence); two counts of misconduct in office; and false imprisonment. He posted a $350,000 bail. The false imprisonment charges were dropped by the grand jury, which added an indictment of reckless endangerment. Judge Williams dropped one of the assault charges after the prosecution rested, ruling there was not enough evidence to prove second-degree assault. Rice's trial began July 7, 2016. He was found not guilty on all counts by Judge Barry Williams on July 18, 2016.

==== Sgt. Alicia D. White ====
White was accused of not calling for medical assistance when she encountered Gray, "despite the fact she was advised that he needed a medic". She was charged with involuntary manslaughter; second-degree assault; and misconduct. She posted a $350,000 bail. The grand jury indicted White on all charges and added an indictment of reckless endangerment. White's trial date was originally set for October 13, 2016. On July 27, 2016, all charges against her were dropped.

In February 2024, she was promoted to the rank of Captain, assigned to oversee the Baltimore Police Public Integrity Bureau (PIB), the department responsible for investigating allegations of wrongdoing by police officers and civilian employees.

== Federal investigations ==
Attorney General Loretta Lynch announced on May 8, 2015, that the Department of Justice would conduct a review of the current practices of Baltimore Police Department on account of the "serious erosion of public trust" in relation to the circumstances of Gray's death. The review took effect immediately, and focused on allegations that Baltimore police officers use excessive force, including deadly force, conduct unlawful searches, seizures or arrests, and engage in discriminatory policing.

As of May 2015, Federal authorities were conducting three probes into Baltimore police, the "pattern of practice" investigation initiated by Lynch, a collaborative review that began in the fall of 2014, and a civil rights probe into the death of Gray.

On September 12, 2017, the U.S. Department of Justice announced it would not bring federal charges against the six Baltimore police officers involved in the arrest, and in-custody death of Freddie Gray.

=== Internal disciplinary board investigations ===
Non-criminal, internal disciplinary trials for the officers were prosecuted by a three person-panel chaired by a representative from another Maryland police agency, and outside lawyer, and former chair of the Baltimore City School Board Neil Dukel.

Of the six officers, Porter did not face internal discipline after investigation by the two county police agencies. Both Nero and Miller pled guilty, accepted departmental discipline and went back at work. Cleared by trial boards were Rice and Goodson. Last, according to police spokesman T.J. Smith, White "would face no further administrative actions".

=== Public response ===
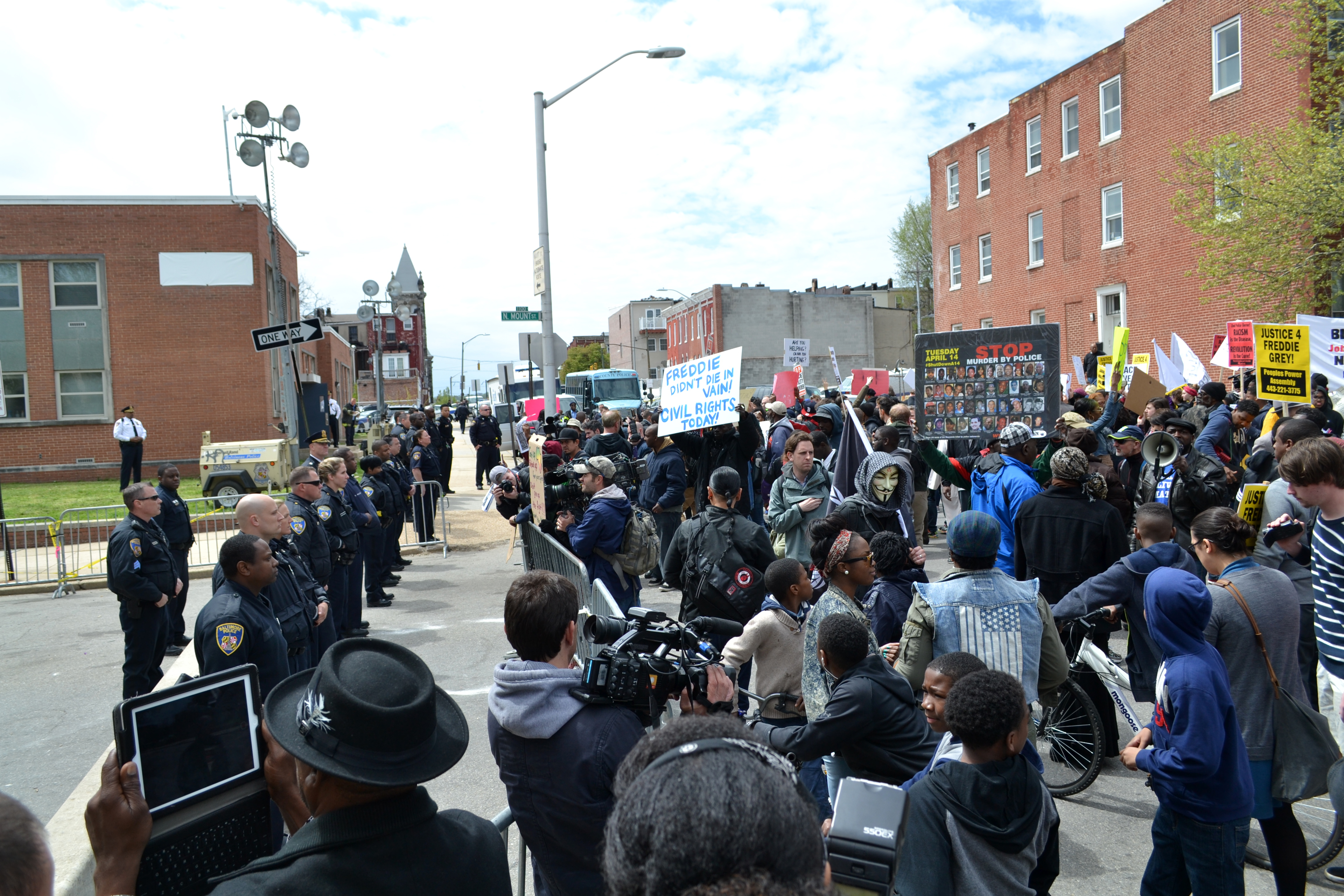
Protesters at a police station near the site of Gray's arrest on April 25

Public reaction to the death has drawn further parallels to the response to the 2014 shooting of Michael Brown, as part of a larger string of controversial uses of force by police officers in the United States against African Americans. As of April 30, 2015, 22 demonstrations had been held nationwide in direct response to Gray's death or in solidarity with Baltimore. Additionally, the Black Lives Matter movement has protested Gray's death.

On April 18, 2015, hundreds of people participated in a protest outside the Baltimore Police Department. Three days later, on April 21, 2015, according to Reuters, "[h]undreds of demonstrators gathered in Baltimore", protesting Gray's death. The next day, Gene Ryan, the president of the local lodge of the Fraternal Order of Police, expressed sympathy for the Gray family, but criticized the "rhetoric of protests" and suggested that "the images seen on television look and sound much like a lynch mob". William Murphy, attorney for the Gray family, demanded an "immediate apology and a retraction". Ryan defended his statement two days later, while admitting that the wording was poor. Charles M. Blow of The New York Times, reminded of a column he wrote several years ago, said that comparing protests to lynch mobs was too extreme because it inflames racial tensions by belittling the significance of the history of lynching in the United States.

On April 25, 2015, protests were organized in downtown Baltimore, and the protests turned violent as protesters threw rocks and set fires. Many protesters were angered students who had been removed from their primary mode of transportation (city buses) and told to disperse from the city. Tension between the riot police and students grew as time passed, eventually leading to bottles and bricks thrown in protest of the large police presence of a so far peaceful protest of Gray's death At least 34 people were arrested, and 15 officers were injured. On April 27, rioting and looting began after the funeral of Gray, with two patrol cars destroyed and 15 officers reported injured. Protesters looted and burned down a CVS Pharmacy location in downtown Baltimore. In reaction to the unrest, the Maryland State Police sent 82 troopers to protect the city. A Major League Baseball (MLB) game between the visiting Chicago White Sox and host Baltimore Orioles scheduled for the evening was postponed due to the unrest. The next game commenced as scheduled but, as a precautionary measure, the match was played behind closed doors, becoming the first crowdless game in MLB history. The next series against the Tampa Bay Rays was moved to St. Petersburg. Maryland Governor Larry Hogan declared a state of emergency, and activated the Maryland National Guard. Hogan also activated 500 state troopers for duty in Baltimore and requested an additional 5,000 police officers from other locales.

At a press conference, Baltimore's mayor announced there would be a citywide curfew from 10:00 p.m. to 5:00 am. School trips were canceled until mid-May, and Baltimore's city schools were closed on April 28. In addition, both the University of Maryland campus in downtown Baltimore and the Mondawmin Mall were closed early.

Protests also took place in other U.S. cities. In New York City, 143 people at Union Square were arrested on April 29, 2015, for blocking traffic and refusing to relocate. On the same day, outside the White House in Washington, D.C., nearly 500 protesters converged without an incident. In Denver, eleven people were arrested as protesters were involved in physical altercations with officers. Other protests in response to Gray's death took place in cities including Chicago, Minneapolis, Miami, Philadelphia, Portland, and Seattle.

On May 3, 2015, the National Guard began withdrawing from Baltimore, and the night curfew on the city was lifted. The demobilizing process lasted three days, during which time the state of emergency remained in effect.

==== Spike in Baltimore homicides ====
In May 2015, there were 43 homicides in Baltimore, making it the deadliest month in 40 years behind August 1972 (45 homicides) and December 1971 (44 homicides). The monthly homicide rate fell to 29 in June 2015 but in July 2015, 45 murders were recorded, tying with the record in 1972. Lt. Gene Ryan, president of Baltimore Fraternal Order of Police, said this was partly due to an increase of confidence among criminals in Baltimore. Police commissioner, Anthony Batts, blamed drugs looted from pharmacies during the riots for the spike in crime.

The 2015 homicide total as of July 31 was 189 compared to 119 by the end of July 2014. On August 3, in an attempt to solve the cases, Baltimore announced the Baltimore Federal Homicide Task Force. It was a partnership of the Baltimore police and five federal crime-fighting agencies. The agencies would each embed two agents with the Baltimore police to help investigate. On July 8, 2015, Mayor Stephanie Rawlings-Blake fired Police Commissioner Anthony Batts, saying that his response to the death of Gray had become a distraction, while the police failed to prevent the spike in homicides.

Baltimore ended the year with 344 homicides, the second-highest total behind 1993, when 353 murders occurred. It was also the first time since 1999 that the city recorded at least 300 homicides within a calendar year.

== Settlement ==
On September 8, 2015, Mayor Stephanie Rawlings-Blake announced that the city had reached a $6.4 million settlement with Gray's family. Rawlings-Blake said the settlement "should not be interpreted as a judgment on the guilt or innocence of the officers facing trial", but had been negotiated to avoid "costly and protracted litigation that would only make it more difficult for our city to heal". The city offered a settlement before they were sued.

== In popular culture ==
The death of Gray has been the subject of several songs. Prince recorded a song called "Baltimore" for his 2015 album Hit n Run Phase Two. The music video featured scenes from protests in response to Gray's death. In May 2015, Salomon Faye released "Black Power", a music video on YouTube that shows rallies in the aftermath of Gray's death. Janelle Monáe and Wondaland released "Hell You Talmbout" in 2015 and said the names of those killed by the police, including Freddie Gray. Dru Hill dedicated their 2016 song "Change" to Gray. In 2016, Kevin Devine released a song called "Freddie Gray Blues" on his ninth studio album Instigator He then went on to release an acoustic version of the song in his 2017 album We Are Who We've Always Been. The avant-garde rock Baltimorean band Horse Lords close their 2016 album, Interventions, with the track "Never Ended", which is built on samples from protests in response to Gray's death. In 2016, Kevin Morby released "Beautiful Strangers", which addressed issues plaguing the world: gun violence, the death of Freddie Gray, and terrorist attacks in Orlando and Paris. In 2017, jazz pianist Lafayette Gilchrist released a song called "Blues For Freddie Gray" on his New Urban World Blues record. Later the same year, singer-songwriter Eliot Bronson released "Rough Ride", a song about Gray. In May 2018, Stephen Malkmus and the Jicks released a song entitled "Bike Lane" on their Sparkle Hard album. The song references the Freddie Gray case.

In 2017, HBO produced Baltimore Rising, a documentary about Gray's death and the subsequent protests. Directed by Sonja Sohn, it charts the impact of the incident on the people of Baltimore.

In March 2017, the Undisclosed podcast launched a 16-part series entitled "The Killing of Freddie Gray" in which it reviewed the evidence, political atmosphere and circumstances around the death of Freddie Gray.

Gray's death and subsequent protest are featured in We Own This City, a six-hour long mini-series which premiered on HBO on April 25, 2022, that focuses on corruption within a Baltimore police task force. It is based on the book We Own This City: A True Story of Crime, Cops and Corruption by Justin Fenton.

Footage from the protests that followed Gray's killing is included in a 2025 music video for "'Baltimore' (In Four Movements)" by Dr. Samuel Waymon.

Taya Graham and Stephen Janis created a 2025 documentary about the killing and subsequent movement called "Freddie Gray: A Decade of Struggle" through The Real News Network.

== See also ==
- List of unarmed African Americans killed by law enforcement officers in the United States
- Lists of killings by law enforcement officers in the United States
- List of killings by law enforcement officers in the United States, April 2015
- Police brutality in the United States
- Running while black
- Death of Tyrone West (2013)
- Death of Sandra Bland (2015)
- Killing of Jeremy McDole (2015)
- Killing of Emantic Fitzgerald Bradford Jr. (2018)
- George Floyd protests (2020)
