= McDole =

McDole is a surname. Notable people with the surname include:

- Mardye McDole (1959–2023), American football player
- Ron McDole (born 1939), American football player

== See also ==
- Shooting of Jeremy McDole
