= List of killings by law enforcement officers in the United States, July 2013 =

This is a list of people reported killed by non-military law enforcement officers in the United States in July 2013, whether in the line of duty or not, and regardless of reason or method. The listing documents the occurrence of a death, making no implications regarding wrongdoing or justification on the part of the person killed or officer involved. Killings are arranged by date of the incident that caused death. Different death dates, if known, are noted in the description. The table below lists 104 people.

== July 2013 ==
| Date | Name (Age) of Deceased | Race | State (City) | Description |
|---|---|---|---|---|
| 2013-07-31 | Jermaine McBean (33) | Black | Florida (Oakland Park) | McBean was carrying an air rifle while having earbuds in his ears, and walking down a busy street. Several people made 911 calls in response to the actions. McBean was shot by Deputy Peter Peraza. Police say that McBean did not follow several demands to drop the weapon. According to McBean's family's attorneys, McBean was carrying the rifle from a pawn shop to his home. On December 11, 2015, Peraza was charged with manslaughter. |
| 2013-07-31 | Russell Rios (19) | Hispanic | Texas (Conroe) | Rios was fatally shot in the back of the head by off-duty officer Sgt. Jason Blackwelder. Officers were detaining Rios outside a Walmart on suspicion of shoplifting when the teen fled into the woods. Blackwelder, who was off-duty, followed him and killed him during an alleged struggle. On September 26, 2013, Blackwelder was indicted on one count of manslaughter, one count of tampering with a government document and one count of false report to a police officer. |
| 2013-07-31 | Paul Schenck (42) | White | Ohio (Yellow Springs) | |
| 2013-07-30 | Allen Desdunes (37) | Black | Louisiana (New Orleans) | |
| 2013-07-30 | Ben Ellett (21) | White | Washington (Orting) | |
| 2013-07-30 | Clifford O'Neal Jones (29) | White | Arkansas (Benton) | |
| 2013-07-30 | Shaun Nathaniel Walters (19) | White | Arizona (Avondale) | |
| 2013-07-30 | Hans Kevin Arellano (22) | Hispanic | California (Santa Ana) | Police officers say the unarmed homeless man got into a "confrontation" with a Santa Ana police officer and took off running. What led to the police officer opening fire is under investigation. |
| 2013-07-29 | Michael Jermaine Lollis (29) | Black | Alabama (Hamilton) | |
| 2013-07-29 | Charles Edward Morales (38) | Hispanic | Texas (El Paso) | |
| 2013-07-29 | Daniel E. DeLong (56) | Unknown race | Kansas (Topeka) | |
| 2013-07-29 | Donna Weaver (40) | White | Florida (Bonita Springs) | |
| 2013-07-28 | Guadalupe Aguilar (39) | Hispanic | Illinois (Chicago) | Aguilar was fatally shot by Chicago police after stabbing and injuring his estranged wife at her home in the Gage Park neighborhood. |
| 2013-07-28 | Casey Daniel Smith (31) | White | Texas (Garland) | |
| 2013-07-28 | Shane Allen Ryan (28) | White | Ohio (Massillon) | |
| 2013-07-28 | Michael Angel Ruiz (44) | Hispanic | Arizona (Phoenix) | |
| 2013-07-28 | Warren Gene Cipriano (30) | Hispanic | Arizona (Gila Bend) | |
| 2013-07-28 | Tyris Wilkerson (32) | Black | Louisiana (Baton Rouge) | |
| 2013-07-28 | Ryan L. Stokes (24) | Black | Missouri (Kansas City) | Stokes and a friend were at the Kansas City Power & Light District when a man and his cousin accused Stokes's friend of stealing a phone. After an officer pepper sprayed the crowd, Stokes took his friend's keys and went to a parking garage to bring his friend's car around. When he got to his friend's car, he held his hands up unarmed after seeing an officer in front of him. Another officer, William Thompson, shot Stokes from behind, killing him. |
| 2013-07-27 | Vargas, Pedro Alberto (42) | Hispanic | Florida (Hialeah) | Pedro Alberto Vargas fatally shot six people inside his Hialeah apartment complex and then took two people hostage for about three hours. After negotiations reportedly broke down, a SWAT team entered the building and fatally shot Vargas after a brief shootout; the two hostages escaped unharmed. |
| 2013-07-27 | Jose Adan Cruz Ocampo (33) | Hispanic | North Carolina (Durham) | Police responded to a reported stabbing. Ocampo reportedly refused to drop the knife and was shot by police. |
| 2013-07-27 | Wrana, John (95) | | Illinois (Park Forest) | Wrana allegedly threatened the staff at an assisted living center with a shoehorn and a kitchen knife, so a Park Forest, Illinois police officer tazered him, and shot him with five bean bag rounds. One struck his abdomen and killed him. The officer who fired the less lethal weapon, Craig Taylor, was charged with felony reckless conduct in Wrana's death. |
| 2013-07-27 | Stacy Guy Garren (49) | White | Texas (Albany) | |
| 2013-07-27 | Jonathan David Rutkowski (20) | White | Pennsylvania (Wernersville) | 20-year-old Jonathan D. Rutkowski carried two handguns in his pants while walking in Wernersville, a small borough west of Reading. A witness saw Rutkowski, a resident of the borough, carrying the guns and called police. Officers from Western Berks Regional, Lower Heidelberg Township, Sinking Spring Borough, and South Heidelberg Township police departments responded and ordered Rutkowski to drop his guns. Ignoring their orders, he fled on foot. Police chased Rutkowski to an isolated spot along Norfolk Southern Railroad tracks, just south of Route 422 which traverses the borough. Continuing to ignore commands to put down the guns, Rutkowski allegedly pointed the guns at the officers who opened fire. Rutkowski had Asperger syndrome, a mild form of autism characterized by social awkwardness and non-compliant behavior that could have contributed to the incident. He sustained multiple handgun and shotgun wounds and died at the scene. Rutkowski never fired the guns, a semi-automatic pistol and a revolver, which were unloaded. |
| 2013-07-26 | Juan Louis Acuna (30) | Hispanic | California (Salinas) | |
| 2013-07-26 | Larry Eugene Jackson Jr. (32) | Black | Texas (Austin) | Jackson was shot and killed by Charles Kleinert, a police detective who was investigating a bank robbery. The detective shot Jackson in the back of the neck after he allegedly fled and then struggled with the officer, according to an initial report. An amended report has since been filed which does not state that Jackson fled or fought with Kleinert. An investigation is pending. In May 2014, Kleinert was charged with manslaughter in connection with Jackson's death. |
| 2013-07-25 | Dainell Simmons (29) | Black | New York (Middle Island) | |
| 2013-07-25 | Luis Alonzo Juarez (42) | Hispanic | California (Compton) | |
| 2013-07-25 | Brent Taylor Catoe (49) | Unknown race | North Carolina (Monroe) | |
| 2013-07-24 | John J. Wheelihan (43) | White | Arizona (Tempe) | |
| 2013-07-24 | Roger "Jeremy" Ramundo (32) | White | Ohio (Cincinnati) | |
| 2013-07-23 | Southaly Ketmany (35) | Asian | Nevada (Las Vegas) | |
| 2013-07-22 | Tevin Hammond (21) | Black | Pennsylvania (Philadelphia) | |
| 2013-07-22 | Thomas Martinez Jr. (40) | Hispanic | Iowa (Coralville) | |
| 2013-07-21 | Garrett Nelson Brooks (28) | White | North Carolina (Wilson) | |
| 2013-07-21 | Tyrone West (44) | Black | Maryland (Baltimore) | Mr. West died while being detained following a vehicle traffic stop. Some witness accounts note severe beating of West prior to his death. |
| 2013-07-21 | Deomain Hayman (28) | Black | Delaware (Wilmington) | |
| 2013-07-21 | Livingston, Kyam (37) | | New York (Brooklyn) | Cell attendants at Brooklyn's Central Bookings Jail repeatedly ignored Livingston's cries for medical attention for a period of seven hours, until finally she died. |
| 2013-07-20 | James Robert Rogers Jr. (49) | White | Maryland (Cockeysville) | |
| 2013-07-20 | Corey Thomas (24) | Black | Georgia (Powder Springs) | |
| 2013-07-19 | Robert Michael McAfee (29) | Hispanic | California (Whittier) | |
| 2013-07-19 | Leigh Weeden (47) | Black | California (Fairfield) | |
| 2013-07-19 | Scott M. Murphy (46) | White | Pennsylvania (Latrobe) | |
| 2013-07-18 | Kong Nay (34) | Asian | South Carolina (Columbia) | |
| 2013-07-18 | Laroy Brown (42) | Black | California (Alameda) | |
| 2013-07-18 | Andrew Thomas (23) | Black | Florida (Pembroke Pines) | |
| 2013-07-18 | Kendall Walker (24) | Black | California (Vacaville) | Walker was shot after he got out of his car and charged towards officers with a hammer and a knife. |
| 2013-07-17 | John Sebastian Snider (38) | White | California (Anderson) | |
| 2013-07-17 | Gerardo Pinedo (19) | Hispanic | Texas (Dallas) | |
| 2013-07-16 | Daryll Blair (19) | Black | Texas (San Antonio) | |
| 2013-07-16 | Marilyn Elizabeth Peterson (68) | White | Pennsylvania (Oil City) | |
| 2013-07-16 | Carlos Crompton (39) | Black | Florida (St. Petersburg) | |
| 2013-07-16 | Juan Diaz Chavez (37) | White | California (Los Angeles) | |
| 2013-07-15 | Deon Williams (26) | Black | Arkansas (Little Rock) | |
| 2013-07-14 | Dustin Cole (24) | White | Texas (Killeen) | |
| 2013-07-14 | Harold J. Bastin (34) | Hispanic | Louisiana (Lafayette) | |
| 2013-07-14 | Zheng Diao (76) | Asian | Minnesota (St. Louis Park) | Diao, a resident at a nursing home, was tasered by police after holding a knife to his own throat, causing him to fall. Diao died on July 29 at Hennepin County Medical Center of aspiration pneumonia, which a medical examiner said was due to the injuries sustained after being tasered. |
| 2013-07-13 | Derek Hobson (25) | White | Indiana (Needham) | |
| 2013-07-12 | Daniel Houfek (42) | White | California (Oak View) | |
| 2013-07-11 | Brian Simms Jr. (24) | Black | Oklahoma (Oklahoma City) | Simms was shot and killed by off duty OKCPD officers working security for a concert. It was reported that Simms had a firearm in his waistband and failed to comply with the officers orders. |
| 2013-07-11 | Rashad Jarrett Hopes (26) | Black | California (Riverside) | |
| 2013-07-11 | Luis Alberto Flores (31) | Hispanic | Arizona (Phoenix) | |
| 2013-07-11 | Kenneth Jewell Stafford (27) | Black | Nevada (Reno) | |
| 2013-07-11 | Jared Woosypiti (24) | White | Kansas (Wichita) | |
| 2013-07-10 | Gerald Altomare Jr. (30) | White | Florida (St. Cloud) | |
| 2013-07-10 | Donald Ray Washington Jr. (20) | Black | Texas (Houston) | |
| 2013-07-10 | Shawn Payne (36) | Black | Colorado (Loma) | |
| 2013-07-09 | Antonio Johnson (40) | Black | Missouri (Hazelwood) | |
| 2013-07-09 | James Ridge (46) | Unknown race | California (Cabazon) | |
| 2013-07-09 | Dante Cespedes (40) | Hispanic | New Jersey (Belleville) | |
| 2013-07-09 | Rafael Salas Adame (42) | Hispanic | Arizona (Yuma) | |
| 2013-07-09 | Pickens, Herman | | Florida (Jacksonville) | Trying to escape from police while a warrant was out on him for armed robbery, he rammed an undercover vehicle, got out of his car, and ran inside nearby restaurant. Reaching for a gun, he was fatally shot by police. |
| 2013-07-08 | Glenn Llewellyn Briggs (57) | Black | Florida (Tallahassee) | |
| 2013-07-08 | Gary L. Wissinger (55) | White | Pennsylvania (Brush Valley) | |
| 2013-07-08 | Lance Clay (50) | White | Georgia (Pooler) | |
| 2013-07-08 | Luke Bulzak (52) | White | Illinois (Batavia Township) | |
| 2013-07-08 | Robert Brooks (27) | White | Pennsylvania (Sewickley) | |
| 2013-07-07 | German Mata (35) | Hispanic | Texas (Amarillo) | |
| 2013-07-07 | Carlos D. Runyon (29) | Black | Kentucky (Louisville) | |
| 2013-07-07 | Adam Ignatz Bosch (29) | White | California (Norco) | |
| 2013-07-07 | Roy D. Barnhart Sr. (62) | White | Illinois (Buckner) | |
| 2013-07-06 | John C. Evans (84) | Unknown race | West Virginia (Craigsville) | |
| 2013-07-06 | Todd Allan Ferguson (34) | White | Arizona (Phoenix) | |
| 2013-07-06 | Lemuel Rufus Furr III (59) | White | North Carolina (Charlotte) | |
| 2013-07-06 | Kou Lee (27) | Asian | California (Fresno) | Kou Lee was killed by Fresno Police as he held his girlfriend at gunpoint, with one gun in each hand pointed at the woman's and his head. Police had been called to the house on South Fourth Street by report of a domestic dispute. |
| 2013-07-05 | James Wyman McGlothlin (39) | White | Florida (Pensacola) | |
| 2013-07-05 | Joel D. Reuter (28) | White | Washington (Seattle) | A man fired a pistol at Seattle SWAT team officers. The SWAT team members responded with gunfire, fatally hitting the man. |
| 2013-07-05 | Vincent Wood (66) | Black | New Mexico (Albuquerque) | Officers responded to a call from a security guard reporting that Wood was threatening two kids with large butcher knives. Police arrived and found Wood, suffering PTSD after serving in Vietnam, holding the knives, in a nearby Circle K gas station parking lot. He allegedly attempted to stab officer Jeff Bludworth until Bludworth and fellow officer Katherine Wright shot and killed him, within a minute of their arrival. Witnesses say he was 4-6' away from officers and an autopsy showed nine gunshot wounds, most going through his back. A wrongful death lawsuit was filed just under two years later. |
| 2013-07-05 | Dean Randolph Jess (42) | White | Montana (Billings) | |
| 2013-07-05 | Larry Hawkins (57) | Unknown race | Iowa (Des Moines) | |
| 2013-07-04 | James Garcia (53) | Hispanic | Michigan (Gilford Township) | |
| 2013-07-04 | Alex Nguyen (31) | Asian | Texas (Arlington) | |
| 2013-07-04 | Christian Green (17) | Black | Illinois (Chicago) | |
| 2013-07-04 | Ernest Foster (37) | Black | California (Indio) | |
| 2013-07-03 | Daniel Ryan Pinney (26) | White | Maine (Calais) | |
| 2013-07-03 | Corey J. Navarrete (23) | White | Massachusetts (Orange) | |
| 2013-07-03 | Brandon Rennie Turner (34) | White | Arkansas (Malvern) | |
| 2013-07-03 | Daniel A. Fitton, Jr (30) | White | Ohio (Boardman) | |
| 2013-07-02 | Cindy Annette Shepard (54) | Unknown race | Oregon (Redmond) | |
| 2013-07-02 | Sengaroune Silaphanhdeth (35) | Asian | California (Oroville) | |
| 2013-07-02 | Andrew Stigliano (27) | White | Massachusetts (Ashland) | |
| 2013-07-02 | Jose Estrada (37) | Hispanic | New Mexico (Las Cruces) | |
| 2013-07-01 | Manfred M. Eisenheim (76) | White | Wisconsin (Pound) | |
| 2013-07-01 | Johnny Taylor (33) | White | Tennessee (Memphis) | |

== See also ==
- Death in custody § United States
- Henry A. Wallace Police Crime Public Database
- List of cases of police brutality
- List of countries with annual rates and counts for killings by law enforcement officers
- List of law enforcement officers killed in the line of duty in the United States
- List of law enforcement officers convicted for an on-duty killing in the United States
- List of shootings by US immigration agents
- List of police reforms related to the George Floyd protests
- List of unarmed African Americans killed by law enforcement officers in the United States
- Lists of killings by law enforcement officers
- Police brutality in the United States
- Police misconduct § United States
- Police riot § United States
- Police use of deadly force in the United States
