= List of killings by law enforcement officers in the United States, April 2015 =

This is a list of people reported killed by non-military law enforcement officers in the United States in April 2015, whether in the line of duty or not, and regardless of reason or method. The listing documents the occurrence of a death, making no implications regarding wrongdoing or justification on the part of the person killed or officer involved. Killings are arranged by date of the incident that caused death. Different death dates, if known, are noted in the description. The table below lists 100 people.

== April 2015 ==
Date	Name (Age) of Deceased	State (City)	Description
2015-04-30	Christian, Alexia (25)	Georgia (Atlanta)	A woman shot at officers in the front of a patrol car while sitting in the back of the car. Officers jumped out and fatally shot her.
2015-04-29	Chavez-Diaz, Luis Martin (27)	California (Elk Grove)	A Game Warden from the California Department of Fish and Wildlife was among the officers raiding a marijuana grow operation in the Stone Lakes National Wildlife Refuge. A man was seen carrying a handgun. When he was told to surrender his weapon he refused and pointed it at a game warden who then shot him. The officers rendered first aid but Luis Martin Chavez-Diaz died.
2015-04-30	Rawshannehad, Fridoon Zalberg (42)	California (San Diego)	A porn shop clerk taking a smoke break in the alley adjacent to the store called 911 reporting that there was a threatening man with a knife. The man allegedly did not comply with the orders of responding officers, charged at them, and was fatally shot. His family filed a wrongful death lawsuit claiming he had no weapon when he was shot. The police department revised its policy to require body cameras be activated when officers arrive at the scene of a critical call.
2015-04-29	Sanchez, Erick Emmanuel (22)	Texas (El Paso)	Officers were responding to a report of a burglary. Sanchez allegedly grabbed a metal object and threatened to kill the officers. A Taser had no effect. Sanchez then allegedly charged officers with the object and was fatally shot.
2015-04-29	Jackson, Andrew (26)	Oklahoma (Chickasha)	Chickasha Police responding to a burglary call saw Jackson and another man walking on the street two houses away. Jackson ran into a nearby house but the second man surrendered to police. Police say the officers went into the home at the known address of the second suspect and encountered Jackson who refused to drop a knife as ordered several times. He was shot and killed. Chickasha Police Officer Chad King who killed Jackson was cleared of any wrongdoing.
2015-04-29	Acree, John (53)	Tennessee (Nashville)	Officers went to serve an arrest warrant for failure to appear in court. Acree ignored officers at the front door and went to the back. He opened the back door holding a semi-automatic pistol. Officer William Wright at the back door, believing Acree was about to shoot, opened fire. Shots were exchanged and Acree died at the scene.
2015-04-29	Deysie, Joshua (33)	Arizona (Mesa)	A realtor was at a house when a stranger came out of the garage and confronted him. The realtor left and called 911. Responding officers found the man upset, pacing, going in and out of the house, and sometimes showing a gun, during a 20–25 minute standoff. The final time he came outside he had a gun drawn and did not obey orders to put it down; he was then fatally shot.
2015-04-29	Adkins, Jeffery O. (53)	Virginia (Emporia)	Adkins was mentally ill and family members had sought help from officials. When Greensville County Sheriff's deputies assisted by Virginia State Police attempted to serve Adkins with an emergency custody order they encountered him outside the residence carrying a sawed-off shotgun. A State Police negotiator was sent to help. About 10 pm, when State Police attempted to gain control of Adkins he fired and was then shot and killed by a Greensville County Sheriff's deputy and a Virginia State trooper.
2015-04-28	Johnson, Jared (21)	Louisiana (New Orleans)	Police responded to a report of an armed robbery at a Dollar General store. Officers found suspects leaving and shot and killed one of them.
2015-04-28	Green, Joshua A. (27)	Illinois (Marion)	Marion Police officers, at about 3:30 am, were investigating a parked car with the dome light on saw ammunition and gloves inside the car. They then heard a scream from inside a nearby apartment and officers were fired on by the suspect. About 7:30 am the suspect, Green, exited the apartment with the hostage, Samantha Holmes. Officers attempted to subdue Green by firing bean bags, but Green fired at officers. Officers returned fire, killing Green and wounding Holmes, who recovered.
2015-04-28	Parker, David (58)	Ohio (Mansfield)	Monday morning, April 27, Parker pointed a gun at a Columbia gas employee who knocked on his door. That resulted in Mansfield Police sending officers, including a SWAT team. Parker remained in the house, firing with a rifle several times Monday afternoon, ignoring police requests to surrender. He was shot by police late Tuesday morning, April 28 and taken to a hospital where he died. Police report that during the siege "there were 22 instances where shootings occurred from inside Parker's residence out towards officers."
2015-04-28	Overstreet, Rashod Bryan (30)	Georgia (Sylvester)	In a 3:50 am incident a patrol car driven by a Worth County Sheriff's deputy ran over and killed Rashod Overstreet, who was lying in the road. A spokesman from the Worth County Coroner's Office reported that the death has been ruled an accident.
2015-04-27	Kellom, Terrance (20)	Michigan (Detroit)	A fugitive task force including officers from the Detroit Police Department and U.S. Immigration and Customs Enforcement (ICE) was attempting serve an armed robbery warrant on Kellom. They were inside the home when, say police, Kellom held a hammer as he charged at the ICE officer who then shot and killed Kellom. Wayne County prosecutor Kim Worthy reported that ICE officer Mitchell Quinn acted in self-defense.
2015-04-26	Genova, Dean Kristian (45)	California (Fountain Valley)	Police were called to a Rite Aid pharmacy shortly after 4 am for a burglary, finding the glass front door smashed open and the suspect inside. The suspect fought with officers trying to detain him, allegedly biting one officer in the arm and grabbing another's handgun. After repeated commands to let go, he was fatally shot by an officer.
2015-04-26	Hanson, Albert Jr. (76)	California (Hanford)	A man with two sporting rifles was shot by Kings County Sheriff SWAT team officers while he sat in his vehicle. He had fired one of his rifles before sheriff's deputies returned fire. The officers had been called by the owner of the property where the man had parked.
2015-04-26	Patrick, Billy Joe (29)	Oklahoma (Bunch)	A warden from the Oklahoma Department of Wildlife was checking the fishing licenses of three men and when he identified Patrick he learned that Patrick was wanted on a warrant for parole violation. He attempted to take Patrick into custody and there was a struggle during which Patrick held the officer's head underwater. The warden shot and killed Patrick.
2015-04-25	Lawrence, Brandon (25)	Texas (Victoria)	Victoria Police Officers responding to an 11 pm disturbance call went to Lawrence's apartment and saw Lawrence, inside, holding a machete. He complied with orders to come outside, but did not drop the machete as ordered. Officers say they shot and killed Lawrence when he advanced toward them and they had nowhere to retreat. Lawrence's widow said he suffered from mental illness, including post-traumatic stress disorder.
2015-04-25	Davis, Daniel Howard (58)	Florida (Clermont)	Davis, who is reported to have had a history of mental illness, was visiting his parents and he told his mother "he was going to die today." He got into an argument with his parents and they called 911. When Deputies from Lake County Sheriffs Office arrived Davis pulled out a knife. A Taser was ineffective and when Davis thrust the knife at a deputy, the deputy shot and killed him.
2015-04-25	Felix, David (24)	New York (Manhattan)	Plainclothes officers forced their way into an apartment building housing people with mental health issues, falsely claiming to serve an arrest warrant related to a purse-snatching incident at Felix's girlfriend's college. After officers found the mentally-ill man watching TV in a sixth-floor apartment, he fled down the fire escape. Police pursued and caught him. During a physical struggle, the man struck both officers with a police radio, which officers considered a weapon. Officers then fatally shot the man at point-blank range.
2015-04-24	Collins, Gary Timmie (63)	Oklahoma (Miami)	Oklahoma Highway trooper waved Collins over at a checkpoint. Collins started to flee. After a six-block pursuit, he stopped and got out of the car, showing a weapon in a threatening manner, and was fatally shot by the trooper. He died at the scene.
2015-04-24	Hawkins, Mark Cecil (49)	Oregon (Salem)	Officers responded to reports of a suspicious vehicle and found Hawkins, who fled to a bus that had been converted to an RV. He shot at officers who returned fire. This repeated over the course of a 7-hour standoff. When police determined they had to end the standoff, officers rammed the RV with heavy equipment to punch holes in it and fired shots into the vehicle, fatally wounding Hawkins. A police dog was wounded in the shooting.
2015-04-24	Dye, Todd Jamal (20)	Colorado (Trinidad)	Police received report of an intruder in a vacant trailer in a trailer park. A responding officer searched the trailer, found a man inside, and told him to get on the ground. He complied, but as the officer began radioing in the report, he jumped up and ran. When the officer told him to stop, he turned around and pointed a gun at the officer, so the officer fatally shot him.
2015-04-23	Morejon, Hector (19)	California (Cambodia Town/Long Beach)	Officers responded to a residential complex in response to reports of several subjects trespassing and vandalizing a vacant residence. Officers saw Morejon in the residence standing next to a wall. Morejon allegedly turned toward the officer while bending his knees and extending his arm; he was then fatally shot. No weapon was found at the scene. Four others were arrested for trespassing. The city of Long Beach agreed to pay Morejon's family $1.5 million to settle a wrongful death claim.
2015-04-23	Valadez, Andrew George (26)	California (Sylmar/Los Angeles)	Morning 911 calls reported a man walking around the streets waving a gun and threatening people. Responding officers found the man with the weapon pointed to his head. When they tried to speak with him, he walked away before allegedly turning around and aiming at the officers. At least one officer fatally shot him in the chest.
2015-04-23	Chatman, Terry Lee (48)	Texas (Houston)	A cyclist was struck and killed by a patrol car before dawn. The car did not have emergency lights or sirens on. The driver claimed to have a green light and claimed he tried to avoid the cyclist but was unsuccessful.
2015-04-23	Potts, Joseph (51)	Oklahoma (Rufe)	Potts used a semi-automatic rifle to shoot at his neighbors and then at officers from the Hugo Police Department and the Choctaw County Sheriff's Office as they approached his home. He set fire to his home and came out. When he tried to grab an officer's gun he was shot and killed. Two officers were shot.
2015-04-23	Dehmann, David Levi (33)	Ohio (Mount Vernon)	Dehmann was reported as drunk and debilitated when arrested by Knox County police officers on 21 April. In custody, Dehmann, who had autism and Tourette's Syndrome, was seen in holding cell video talking to and attempting to hug an officer following a pat-down. Leaving for custody, Dehmann pointed towards two officers, one of whom, Deputy Chase Wright, reacted aggressively, prompting a defensive reaction from Dehmann. Deputy Wright then slammed Dehmann's head into the floor of the custody suite in a take-down move. Dehmann was transferred to hospital, but never recovered from the blow, dying less than 48 hours from arriving at the Sheriff's Office.
2015-04-22	Janks, Karen (46)	California (Sebastopol)	Janks was allegedly speeding up to 100 mph on a highway from Windsor to Sebastopol with Sonoma County Sheriff's Deputies chasing her for 19 miles. At a parking lot of an antique store in Gravenstein Highway, Janks allegedly accelerated towards deputies, injuring three of them; one required hospitalization. Janks was shot by four deputies and died two days later in the hospital.
2015-04-22	Vang, Lue (39)	Colorado (Eldorado Springs)	Boulder County Sheriffs Deputies responding to a reported kidnapping found the suspect in the back seat of a parked car, with a pistol pointed at the front seat passenger, who turned out to be his brother-in-law. The driver was his father-in-law. A deputy fired his rifle, killing Vang. The shooting was found to be justified.
2015-04-22	Ramirez, Carlos Saavedra (51)	Arizona (Bisbee)	Bisbee Police officers responded to a call from a woman in her car in a supermarket parking lot. She reported the suspect was banging on her car window and being aggressive. Officers found Ramirez behind the store, carrying a knife. During the encounter he became disorderly or aggressive and an office shot and killed him. Ramirez was a homeless man who is reported to have had mental problems.
2015-04-22	McGregor, Reginald Duane (31)	Texas (Fort Worth)	McGregor was shot and killed by Fort Worth Police officers who were responding to a 911 call reporting a burglary at the address. Reports say an armed intruder fought with and shot one of the residents and then was killed by police outside the home.
2015-04-22	Efraim, Jonathan (30)	New York (Queens)	Efraim was involved in an argument and opened fire in a crowded bar, prompting 911 calls. Responding officers pursued Efraim; after about a block he turned and fired twice at the officers, then ran again. When he raised his weapon at the officers again, they shot and killed him.
2015-04-22	Chapman, William L. II (18)	Virginia (Portsmouth)	Officer Stephen Rankin, responding to a shoplifting call, shot and killed Chapman after a struggle between the two. Officer Rankin had previously shot and killed Kirill Denyakin and had been suspended from street patrol for a few years prior to Chapman's death. Chapman's family was not informed until much later in the day after hearing the story on the news, and after his mother called 9-1-1 to file a missing persons report.
2015-04-21	Covarrubias, Daniel (37)	Washington (Lakewood)	A worker called 911 to report a man running through a lumber yard, in combination with hearing sirens, assuming he was running from officers. Police, who were not looking for Covarrubias prior to the call, found Covarrubias standing atop a 25-foot pile of lumber and say he pointed his cell phone at them like a gun. About six seconds passed between when Covarrubias first stood up and allegedly pointed the phone to when the last shot was fired. He had gone to a hospital hours earlier due to hallucinations.
2015-04-21	Martinez, Luis Molina (35)	California (Los Angeles)	Los Angeles Police officers were called with a report of a suicidal man. When officers arrived they encountered Martinez who was holding a large knife. When he advanced toward the officers they shot and killed him.
2015-04-21	Davenport, Stephen Gene (40)	Mississippi (Meridian)	Lauderdale County Sheriff's Deputies were called to break up a 3 am fight between two men. Davenport resisted and fought with the two deputies, one of whom used his Taser. With the help of two more deputies they subdued Davenport who "became unresponsive" and was transported to a local hospital where he died.
2015-04-21	Key, Kimber (59)	South Carolina (Irmo)	When Kimber Key became suicidal his brother called for help and two deputies from Lexington County Sheriff's Office were sent for a welfare check. When deputies encounterd Kimber Key in the kitchen he was holding a knife. A deputy shot him in the chest and he died at a hospital.
2015-04-21	Wolfe, Daniel (35)	New Jersey (Union)	Troopers were conducting surveillance of an allegedly stolen car (Wolfe's relatives say he worked for a towing company that owned it) when a man identified as a suspect in a carjacking over a month prior got into the car. Police converged on the car. Wolfe drove it in reverse, ramming a parked vehicle and then accelerated forwards at a trooper, who fired multiple rounds. Wolfe died at the hospital shortly thereafter.
2015-04-20	Hernandez, Santos Cortez (24)	Texas (Mission)	"Cuate" Hernandez was wanted for burglary, attempted murder, theft, and evading arrest. Hidalgo County Sheriff Deputies say that they then located Hernandez and attempted to arrest him, he reached for a handgun. Deputies shot him five or six times and he died at the scene.
2015-04-19	Cooper, Norman Lee (33)	Texas (San Antonio)	San Antonio Police officers responding to a "family disturbance" report tried to escort Cooper out of the residence. He resisted and the officers Tased him. After he pulled out the Taser prongs they tased him a second time. Police say he appeared to be under the influence of drugs or alcohol. When the officers got Cooper under control they noticed he was unresponsive. He died at the scene.
2015-04-19	Hlavinka, Dana Duwane (44)	Nebraska (Sidney)	Officers from the Sidney Police Department investigating a domestic disturbance call found Mrs. Hlavinka bleeding and running from the house. When officers entered the house they found Mr. Dana Hlavinka was armed with a knife. Officers fatally shot Mr. Hlavinka.
2015-04-19	Foster, Michael (40)	Kentucky (Wilmore)	An armed man was shot and killed after confronting officers outside a residence. He had previously called a suicide hotline threatening to kill himself.
2015-04-18	Tellez, Erik (43)	Arizona (Phoenix)	Phoenix Police officers were sent to a park to investigate a man acting suspiciously. The man told police that snipers had rifles pointing at him, then went into a van where he had his gun and shot at the approaching officers. Police returned fire, killing Tellez. Police say there was an order in effect to have law enforcement pick up Tellez and take him to a mental health facility for examination.
2015-04-18	McCarroll, Thaddeus (23)	Missouri (Jennings)	The man's mother reported he had barricaded himself in. Officers tried to engage McCarroll but he refused. A few hours later he came out of the house with a knife and Bible. Officers first shot his leg with a rubber bullet which didn't stop him and he allegedly charged at officers, at which point they shot him.
2015-04-18	Acton, Brian (40)	Tennessee (Columbia)	Brian Acton, a registered sex offender, died when Columbia Police officer took him into custody at the home of a woman he had sexually assaulted. Police say they used only their hands to control him and put him into handcuffs. He had stopped breathing and was transported to a local hospital where he died.
2015-04-18	Sapp, Grover Zeno, Jr. (45)	Florida (Panama City)	Panama City Police responded to 5:00 am report of a man carrying a "long gun" on the street. Sapp fired the shotgun as police entered the area. When police approached Sapp and ordered him to put the shotgun down he pointed it at the officers. Police shot Sapp and he was pronounced dead at a local hospital.
2015-04-17	Cavazos, Elias (29)	California (Hemet)	A Riverside County Sheriff deputy and a California Highway Patrol officer were working with an anti-gang task force when they spotted Cavazos, as a passenger in a vehicle. He was wanted on a warrant as a parolee at large. They stopped the vehicle and Cavazos exited the vehicle and shot at the officers. They shot back, killing Cavazos.
2015-04-17	Kemp, Jeffery (18)	Illinois (Chicago)	Chicago Police officers on patrol heard gunshots and saw a van speeding away from the area. During the pursuit a man armed with a gun jumped from the van. The man failed to obey orders to drop the gun and pointed it at the officers. One officer shot and killed him.
2015-04-16	Velazquez, Rodolfo (47)	California (Shafter)	Shafter Police were called to investigate a man, possible armed with a knife, possibly on drugs, who was acting erratically in an alley. Officers reported that the man did pull out a knife when they arrived. He refused to drop the knife and moved toward the officers, who shot and killed him. A toxicology report found a high level of methamphetamine in his system.
2015-04-16	Brown, Darrell (31)	Maryland (Hagerstown)	Washington County Emergency Services dispatchers received calls from two people shortly after 10:30 pm, police said. One of the callers said a black man wearing jeans and a shirt entered her house, then left and was seen staggering outside. The initial investigation showed the man, later identified as Brown, entered a home on North Prospect Street. Police say they shot Brown with a Taser in front of the home when he acted aggressively and failed to obey the commands of officers. Officers placed Brown in handcuffs and accompanied him to the hospital in an ambulance. Brown was pronounced dead at 12:11 am.
2015-04-16	Shephard, Frank (41)	Texas (Houston)	The father of 3+, wanted for allegedly making unsafe lane changes, refused to pull over and called 911 threatening to harm a child in the vehicle if police tried to stop him again. A 15-20 minute pursuit ended in a collision at an intersection and he was shot (10-12 shots fired) when he got out of the car. There was no child in the vehicle.
2015-04-16	Kapuscinski, David (39)	Michigan (Gilbraltar)	Gibraltar Police officers responding to a 3:00 am domestic dispute call used multiple tasers to subdue Kapuscinski, who became unresponsive and died of cardiac dysrhythima. The County Medical Examiner found methamphetamine in his system.
2015-04-15	Flores, Ernesto (52)	California (Montclair)	San Bernardino Sheriff deputies responded to a call of an agitated man barricaded inside his home. The deputies called for him to come outside. Eventually he did come out holding what turned out to be a pellet rifle. After he ignored deputies commands to drop the gun he was shot with several bean bags and went to the ground. While on the ground he pointed the rifle in the direction of deputies and they fired, striking Flores about ten times. He died at the hospital.
2015-04-15	Watson, Stanley (72)	Colorado (Cañon City)	Cañon City Police officers responded to a man who called in and threatened to kill his wife and himself. When police arrived his wife's body was on the ground outside the home. After a standoff of several hours the man came out shooting at police who then shot and killed him.
2015-04-15	Adair, Mark W. (51)	Missouri (Columbia)	A University of Missouri Police Officer encountered Adair, who was wanted for armed robbery, in a parking garage. As Adair raised his pistol and approached the officer the two struggled and Adair was shot and killed.
2015-04-15	Barkley, Tevin (22)	Florida (Miami)	Miami-Dade Police officers were in the area of a shots fired report when they encountered Barkley. There was a confrontation and an officer shot and mortally wounded Barkely. Police found a Cobray M-11 weapon at the scene.
2015-04-15	Noble, Donte Adaryll (41)	South Carolina (Spartanburg)	Spartanburg Police Officers responding to a 911 call which sounded like a domestic dispute. They broke in, found the suspect stabbing the victim, and shot the suspect. The victim had several stab wounds. Both the victim and the suspect, Donte Noble, died.
2015-04-14	Robinson, Colby (26)	Texas (Dallas)	The man was the primary suspect in murders of two individuals (and critical injury of a third) in the medical marijuana industry. He was recognized by a 7-11 clerk who had just been shown his photo by police, and followed the suspect to get a license plate number. Desoto Police found the truck and pursued the suspect, shooting him after he left the truck and began fleeing on foot.
2015-04-14	Finley, Christopher Grant (31)	Arkansas (Jonesboro)	Jonesboro Police officers were sent to a residence where Finley, who was wanted on felony charges, was reportedly in the yard, screaming. When Patrolman Heath Loggians arrived he followed Finley as he fled into the home. Loggains was pushing on the front door when Finley attacked him with a machete. Loggains shot and fatally wounded Finley.
2015-04-13	Nunez, Celin (24)	Texas (Houston)	Nunez was behaving erratically and witnesses said he appeared to be mentally ill. He climbed into someone's vehicle and off-duty Houston Police officer David Sudderth, who was working as a security guard, approached the crowd of bystanders. Sudderth thought that Nunez was trying to steal the pickup. When Sudderth, looking through the truck's tinted windows, thought he saw Nunez pointing a weapon, he shot and killed Nunez. The object Nunez held turned out to be a welding gun.
2015-04-13	Jiminez, Isaac (27)	Illinois (Alton)	The suspect in a home break-in was believed to be armed, told to drop his weapon, did not comply, and was fatally shot in the chest. Jiminez may also have been involved in a shooting the previous day.
2015-04-12	Weaver, Richard Dale (83)	Oklahoma (Oklahoma City)	The elderly man did not comply with officers' order to drop his machete and was shot. He was pronounced dead at the scene.
2015-04-12	Long, Mack (36)	Indiana (Indianapolis)	The suspect was pulled over during a traffic stop and fled into the woods. Officers chased the armed suspect and gunfire was exchanged.
2015-04-12	Evans, Jason Lee (32)	North Carolina (Salemburg)	When Sampson County Sheriff Deputies used stop sticks to stop the vehicle of armed robbery suspect Evans, he got out of the vehicle and pointed a gun at Deputy Louis M. High, Jr. The two exchanged gunfire and Evans was killed.
2015-04-12	Gray, Freddie (25)	Maryland (Baltimore)	Police encountered Gray in a high-crime area and he ran when police approached. According to Gray's attorney, officers thought he may have been involved in a crime. Police pursued and caught Gray. Less than an hour after being arrested, transported, and held, his spine was broken. After a short while, he was transported to the hospital where he lapsed into a coma, was resuscitated, stayed in a coma, underwent surgery, and died from the injuries a week later, still in police custody. His death was ruled a homicide caused by severe trauma. All six officers involved in his (allegedly illegal) arrest have been charged.
2015-04-11	Allen, Donald (66)	Oklahoma (Sand Springs)	Police say the Vietnam veteran was experiencing a mental health breakdown when he rushed Barnett holding a loaded pistol, threatening to kill him.
2015-04-11	Corona, Angel Cresencio, Jr. (21)	California (Corning)	Tehama Co. Sheriffs deputies responded to a report of domestic violence in Corning. A deputy saw Angel Corona, Jr. outside a residence stabbing a man. The deputy shot and killed the suspect. The stabbing victim was reported in stable condition in a hospital. The District Attorney ruled the shooting justified.
2015-04-10	Reed, Richard Brian (38)	Kansas (Topeka)	After Reed hijacked two cars, crashing the second car into an officer's patrol car, he shot at offices with an assault rifle. He was then shot by officers from the Topeka Police and the Capitol Police. He died of his wounds Saturday, 18 April 2015, at a Topeka hospital.
2015-04-09	Smith, Don (29)	Indiana (Lafayette)	When officers responded to a robbery at a machine shop in Illinois, suspect Smith took a woman hostage at gunpoint and took her with her truck, leading police on a chase until the Indiana state line. Smith continued with another armed robbery where employees were also tied up. Another police chase ended when the vehicle was stopped by "stop sticks" and the suspect carjacked another vehicle. When officers surrounded the vehicle, Smith allegedly pointed a gun at officers and they fatally shot him.
2015-04-09	Kimbrell, Gordon Talmage (22)	Florida (Navarre)	Police arrived at Kimbrell's home after he was reported to be acting erratically after drinking rum. Kimbrell allegedly threw knives at an officer and attacked an officer with a sword, injuring him. Kimbrell was shot dead by an officer.
2015-04-09	Burgess, Phillip (28)	South Carolina (Boiling Springs)	Fatally shot when deputies tried to serve a drug-related search warrant at his home.
2015-04-09	Leipold, Jess (31)	Pennsylvania (Gettysburg)	Leipold went to the Adams County Prison and threatened officers there. After a standoff of about one-half hour outside the prison, Leipold pointed an AR-15 rifle at the prison lobby. State police Sgt. Matt Nickey then shot and mortally wounded Leipold.
2015-04-08	Rodriguez, Roberto (39)	California (Los Angeles)	Suspect in fatal shooting killed by LAPD.
2015-04-08	Lemon, Michael Earl (57)	California (Lake Isabella)	Kern County Sheriff Deputies investigating a disturbance of the peace contacted Lemon. When he attempted to walk back into his house a struggle ensued with the deputies using batons, pepper spray, and tasers. After they placed him in handcuffs he began having trouble breathing and was pronounced dead at a hospital.
2015-04-08	Weber, Joseph (28)	California (Sunnyvale)	Weber allegedly robbed a liquor store with a knife and was then shot by a responding officer after unheeded demands that he drop the knife.
2015-04-08	Hanson, Roston Lee (2 months)	Kansas (Jetmore)	Hodgeman County Deputy Sheriff Kody Hanson was arrested for the death of his infant son, Roston Lee Hanson.
2015-04-08	Smith, Mark (54)	Oklahoma (Kellyville)	Creek County Sheriff Deputies investigating a domestic violence incident encounterd Smith and talked with him on the phone for about one-half hour. Smith attempted to drive away from the scene, showing the deputies a rifle in his pickup. Smith's pickup struck one deputy and the other officers shot and killed Smith. The deputy who had been struck was not seriously injured.
2015-04-08	Faith, Douglas Dewayne (60)	Texas (San Antonio)	San Antonio Police Chief Anthony Trevino said Faith drove away from a traffic stop but was later spotted and pulled over again. Faith exited his vehicle holding a gun causing the officers to back off. He drove away a second time and shot at police during the pursuit. When his vehicle crashed and officers approached he fired at them and they returned fire. He was killed in his car.
2015-04-08	Bethea, Dexter (42)	Georgia (Valdosta)	While attempting to arrest Bethea after a drug deal, he drove his car toward the officers, who opened fire and killed him.
2015-04-07	Rose, Erick (32)	Oklahoma (Pottawatomie County)	A high-speed car chase following a burglary ended in a shoot-out with police.
2015-04-06	Larsen, Tyrell (31)	Idaho (Bonneville County)	Larsen was stopped by a deputy in his pickup truck and picked up a .22-caliber rifle. The deputy shot Larsen.
2015-04-06	Myers, Alexander (23)	Indiana (Indianapolis)	Indianapolis Metropolitan Police Department Officers, responding to a report of a suicidal man, met Myers holding a rifle. When Myers pointed his rifle at them and fired, the officers returned fire, killing him. Myers' mother reported he suffered from depression.
2015-04-06	Willis, Desmond (25)	Louisiana (Harvey)	Jefferson Parish Sheriff's Office Deputies attempted a traffic stop on Willis' vehicle as part of a narcotics investigation. Willis drove away and after he crashed his vehicle, fled on foot. Willis engaged in a gun battle with deputies and he was shot and killed.
2015-04-06	Forsyth, Jared (33)	Florida (Ocala)	Jared Forsyth, an Ocala Police Officer, was accidentally shot and killed by another officer during firearms training.
2015-04-05	Hanna, Richard August (56)	California (Tehachapi)	Tehachapi Police officers, responding to a domestic violence call, found Hanna sitting in his vehicle. He fired once then left the vehicle, unarmed and advanced toward the officers. They shot and killed him. The Kern County Coroner ruled the death a homicide. The Kern County District Attorney ruled the shooting justified.
2015-04-05	Cockerel, Ken (51)	Arizona (Phoenix)	Phoenix Police responded to reports of a man stabbing himself. Four officers responded and when Cockerel advanced toward the officers with two knives raised, two officers shot and killed him.
2015-04-04	Dick, William J., III (28)	Washington (Tonasket)	Officers from the U.S. Forest Service and the Washington State Police pursued Dick, an armed robbery suspect, in their vehicles and finally, after his crash, on foot. After they tased him and handcuffed him and he stopped breathing.
2015-04-04	Howell, Justus (17)	Illinois (Zion)	Howell was shot by Zion police. He had allegedly been involved in the theft of a gun shortly prior to the shooting incident, and was running away with it as he was shot twice in the back. The prosecutor decided that the shooting was justified and that no charges would be filed.
2015-04-04	Scott, Walter L. (50)	South Carolina (North Charleston)	Walter L. Scott was fatally shot by officer Michael Slager during a traffic stop. Slager was subsequently charged with murder.
2015-04-04	Noll, Ethan (34)	New Mexico (Edgewood)	Police responded to a call of a man in a neighborhood armed with a rifle and firing shots. A standoff between Noll and officers ensued, and Noll was killed by an officer.
2015-04-04	Anderson, Paul (31)	California (Orange)	Police stopped a car to serve an arrest warrant on a female passenger in the car. The driver, Anderson, got out of the car and was holding a weapon, and an Anaheim police officer fatally shot him.
2015-04-03	Lynch, David Cody (33)	Oklahoma (Warner)	A Warner Police Officer responding to a traffic accident was assaulted by Lynch and officers tased him and handcuffed him. When they noticed Lynch was not breathing they had him taken to a hospital where he was pronounced dead.
2015-04-03	Prevatt, Christopher (38)	Virginia (Frederick County)	Officers entered the home in response to an emergency domestic call, encountered Prevatt, and shot him. He died at the scene.
2015-04-02	Langford, Darrin (32)	Illinois (Rock Island)	Responding to a complaint of shots fired, Officer Ryan Derudder confronted and pursued an armed Langford who was subsequently shot dead.
2015-04-02	Hicks, Donald J. (63)	Illinois (Metropolis)	Massac County Sheriff Deputies responded to a call of a suicidal man threatening to shoot himself. Eventually officers from the Illinois State Police and the Metropolis Police Department also responded. Hicks's vehicle was stopped by spike sticks deployed by officers from the Metropolis Police Department. He exited his vehicle armed with a handgun and the officers used their tasers but were unable to control Hicks. When he pointed the weapon at officers they shot and killed him.
2015-04-02	Harris, Eric (44)	Oklahoma (Tulsa)	Harris is seen running from police before a voice shouts "Taser, Taser". A moment later, there is a single gunshot, and voice says, "Oh, I shot him. I'm sorry." Harris cries out, "He shot me, man. Oh, my god. I'm losing my breath." "Fuck your breath. Shut the fuck up," an officer shouts back in response. Harris was unarmed at the time of the shooting. Part-time volunteer reserve Deputy Robert Bates, 73, was charged with manslaughter. He was convicted and sentenced to four years in prison.
2015-04-02	Rutledge, Aaron, Marcus (27)	Louisiana (Pineville)	Rutledge has been described as a recruiter for the Louisiana National Guard who returned from overseas service "with problems." Rapides Parish Sheriff's deputies had been called to the scene because he was armed and threatening to harm himself or others. Deputies talked to him for over an hour but when he pointed his weapon at the deputies a deputy shot and killed him.
2015-04-02	Ivy, Donald "Dontay" Shaw (39)	New York (Albany)	Ivy, who was mentally ill, was tased in a 12:36 AM street confrontation with Albany Police Officers. Officers handcuffed him and when they saw that he had stopped breathing they performed CPR and he was taken to a hospital where he was pronounced dead. Ivy's family says he had heart problems.
2015-04-01	Clyde, Sean (36)	New Jersey (Hamilton)	Clyde was found repeatedly stabbing his 54-year-old father (and mother when she tried to intervene) and refused to drop the knife. He was shot by police and died in the hospital April 15.
2015-04-01	Washington, Robert (38)	California (Hawthorne)	Washington and his two half-brothers pursued a woman (Denise Berry) and her twelve-year-old son who may have laughed at them when passing in traffic. Ms. Berry stopped a patrol car to report being followed. The pursuers arrived, and Washington stepped out of the car and opened fire, killing Ms. Berry and wounding her child. The officer in the patrol car returned fire and killed Washington. One of his half-brothers, the driver, was charged with murder and attempted murder; the other half-brother was released.

== See also ==
- Death in custody § United States
- Henry A. Wallace Police Crime Public Database
- List of cases of police brutality
- List of countries with annual rates and counts for killings by law enforcement officers
- List of law enforcement officers killed in the line of duty in the United States
- List of law enforcement officers convicted for an on-duty killing in the United States
- List of shootings by US immigration agents
- List of police reforms related to the George Floyd protests
- List of unarmed African Americans killed by law enforcement officers in the United States
- Lists of killings by law enforcement officers
- Police brutality in the United States
- Police misconduct § United States
- Police riot § United States
- Police use of deadly force in the United States
