= Death of Tyrone West =

2013 death of a man in Baltimore police custody

- Date: July 18, 2013
- Time: 7:13 p.m. to 8:11 p.m.
- Duration: 58 minutes
- Location: Kitmore Road and Kelway Road New Northwood neighborhood Baltimore, Maryland, U.S.; 39.350993°N 76.594250°W
- Type: Death while in police custody
- Cause: Cardiac arrhythmia, dehydration, positional asphyxia
- Participants: Tyrone West; 5 Baltimore police officers (directly); 1 Morgan State University officer (directly); 6 other law enforcement officers (on scene)
- Inquiries: U.S. Department of Justice; Baltimore Police Department
- Coroner: David Fowler
- Charges: none
- Litigation: Multimillion-dollar lawsuit filed on June 23, 2014

On July 18, 2013, Tyrone West, a 44-year-old African American male, was pursued by two officers of the Baltimore Police Department after he fled a traffic stop during which cocaine was allegedly found. The cocaine later went missing in police possession after a subpoena was issued. West was on parole at the time of this incident with an extensive criminal record including assault, resisting arrest, and attempted first-degree murder. West ultimately died during the scuffle with police and various medical experts have given conflicting assessments of contributing factors including cardiac arrhythmia, dehydration, positional asphyxia, and extreme environmental temperatures.

The incident fueled tension in the North Baltimore community, playing a contributing factor in the eventual Baltimore riots of 2015. The death of West drew attention from notable African American leaders including U.S. Attorney General Loretta Lynch, State's Attorney Marilyn Mosby, Baltimore Mayor Stephanie Rawlings-Blake, and celebrity Charles Barkley.

Three separate investigations, both internal and external, repeatedly exonerated the officers involved, but a series of police actions were identified that negatively impacted the encounter. The incident, and subsequent recommendations made by an independent panel, encouraged the police department to make significant procedural changes.

== Background ==
=== Tyrone West ===
Tyrone Antonio West was born on May 22, 1969, to Phillip West and Shirley Anderson at Johns Hopkins Hospital in Baltimore. He was raised by his aunt Diane Butler and his uncle Clifton Anderson. West was a talented artist and fitness buff in good physical condition, standing six feet tall and weighing 237 pounds. He was known by the nickname Weeda, described by family as an avid baseball fan with three children and two grandchildren.

The criminal history of Tyrone West dates back to 1991, with prior convictions of assault, battery, use of a deadly weapon with intent to injure, and handgun and drug violations. Notably, West had three previous convictions for resisting arrest, was charged with attempted first-degree murder in 1999, and had prosecutors drop additional charges in another attempted murder case. After convictions for assault and drug distribution in 2000, West spent twelve years in prison before being released on parole during the summer of 2012. He was living at 2413 Guilford Avenue in North Baltimore during the summer of 2013.

=== Police officers ===
Ten Baltimore Police officers and two Morgan State University officers of white, black, and Hispanic descent were eventually on scene during the arrest and death of Tyrone West. Eight of the ten Baltimore police officers were investigated including Derrick Dewayne Beasley, Jorge Omar Bernardez-Ruiz, Nicholas David Chapman, Matthew Rea Cioffi, Alex Ryan Hashagen, Eric Maurice Hinton, Latreese Nicole Lee, and Danielle Angela Lewis. Additionally, David Lewis was investigated, one of the two Morgan State University patrolmen who responded.

Seventeen days prior, on July 1, 2013, Nicholas Chapman and Jorge Omar Bernardez-Ruiz allegedly used excessive force to subdue a man named Abdul-Jaami Salaam during a traffic stop in Baltimore. Salaam was eventually awarded $70,000 in damages on March 29, 2016, in the resulting civil suit against Chapman, Bernardez-Ruiz, and a cohort. Chapman was also involved in a $147,000 settlement in an excessive force lawsuit after a jury found in favor of two men - Leo and James Green, who filed suit against five officers, including Chapman, for battery and false arrest after a traffic stop on June 13, 2013, eighteen days prior to the assault on Abdul Sallaam and thirty-five days prior to the death of Mr. West.

== Attempted arrest and death ==
=== Initial encounter ===
Baltimore temperatures on July 18, 2013, were well above normal with a high of 97° F (36° C), humidity as high as 87%, and a heat index of at least 105.5 °F (41 °C). West borrowed a 1999 Mercedes-Benz owned by his sister, school teacher Tawanda Jones, when an acquaintance named Cortinthea Servance contacted him for a ride. West was described as an unlicensed cab driver who provided transportation to neighborhood residents. Servance met him at the intersection of Loch Raven Boulevard and Winston Avenue in the North Baltimore neighborhood of New Northwood. They drove four-tenths of a mile to the intersection of Kitmore Road and Northwood Drive to eat the boxes of chicken West had picked up. After a few minutes, Servance asked West to back up in the intersection and turn east on Kitmore Road, deciding to return to her mother's house on Kitmore.

They were passed by officers Chapman and Bernardez-Ruiz driving an unmarked police vehicle wearing ballistic vests and BPD badges but not in uniform, all according to standard protocol for the Northeast Operations Unit. They observed a dark green Mercedes unsafely backing into an intersection and turning eastbound on Kitmore Road at which point they turned around and began to follow the car. The officers recall the Mercedes accelerating well above the speed limit, while Servance maintains West proceeded slowly while balancing the chicken box in his lap. The driver and passenger reportedly made suspicious movements inside the car after making eye contact with the police.

=== Traffic stop and attempted arrest ===
The cars had proceeded one block east of Northwood Drive on Kitmore Road when the officers initiated a traffic stop at 7:13 p.m., citing suspicious behavior and backing into an intersection. West turned south on Kelway Road and stopped the car adjacent to 1365 Kitmore Road. The temperature remained around 91 °F (33 °C) with a heat index of 102.9 °F (39 °C) and 61% humidity. Both officers approached and asked if the occupants were carrying drugs, asking them to step out of the car at which point Servance refused. Police requested a female officer to search Servance and both suspects were placed on the curb while the car was searched.

During questioning, police claimed to notice a bulge in West's sock, discovering a bag of cocaine when West shoved Officer Bernardez-Ruiz backward. Possession of cocaine would have been in violation of his parole and would have likely resulted in an eight-year prison sentence. Investigators later claimed to have found 13 bags of cocaine in the car totaling roughly a gram. Only a couple of witnesses agreed to be interviewed, but they all concurred that West initiated the fight. The suspect punched Bernardez-Ruiz who placed West in a bear hug. Officer Chapman joined the fracas but West was too strong to be restrained.

Tyrone West fled northwest across Kitmore Road when Chapman contacted dispatch with an officer-in-distress call. West was wrestled to the ground by both officers near an alleyway. Witnesses including Servance stated West kept getting up and resisting, still punching and kicking officers. Repeatedly, West would seemingly comply with officers, only to resume punching, kicking, and pushing. A witness claimed that police used a taser on West when he failed to comply, but evidence verified that no taser was ever used.

Officers deployed Oleoresin Capsicum Spray and Chapman struck West in the thigh with a baton, but he seemed unfazed. Police were incapacitated by the spray and West escaped their grasp before they could handcuff him. Bernardez-Ruiz verbally stated to let him go when West attacked them a fourth time before fleeing in the direction of his sister's Mercedes, eventually tackled on the sidewalk in front of 1365 Kitmore Road.

After a second and third distress call, five backup officers finally arrived on scene, at least three of whom were black. Two Morgan State University policemen, Officer David Lewis and his partner, were the first backup to arrive, coming from campus one mile away. They were closely followed by a Baltimore police car driven by trainee Danielle Lewis with fellow officers Latreese Nicole Lee and Matthew Cioffi. The Morgan State officer arriving eastbound on Kitmore Road stopped his vehicle at the scuffle just prior to the intersection with Kelway Road when he was rear-ended by Lewis.

Bernardez-Ruiz and Chapman were exhausted and suffering from the effects of the pepper spray, now retreating while backup officers attempted to control West still fighting and kicking. A witness recalled seeing West and Morgan State Officer Lewis punching each other before West was tackled and pepper sprayed.

Two more Baltimore officers arrived, bringing the police presence to nine, while a police helicopter arrived overhead. West was finally subdued and four officers departed the melee to speak with three arriving officers, twelve policemen now present including Derrick Beasley, Alex Hashagen, and Eric Hinton. Only six officers were actually involved in restraining West.

=== Death ===
One witness, who asked not to be identified, reported seeing officers strike West with batons and kick his back and head. A Baltimore officer thought he saw Morgan State Officer Lewis with his knees across West's back, telling him not to do that, but other officers dispute that ever happening. West was in handcuffs when he appeared to experience a medical episode with labored breathing, so Chapman immediately radioed for medical help.

As supervising Officer Corey Jennings arrived to find West unresponsive, he removed his handcuffs, turned him over, and immediately started CPR. EMT personnel arrived within five minutes and CPR was performed for about 20 minutes.

Continuing lifesaving measures, they transported West to Good Samaritan Hospital where he was eventually pronounced dead at 8:11 p.m. When the local news ran the story at 10:00 p.m. that evening, Tyrone's younger sister Tawanda Jones and family recognized Tyrone's body before they were notified by law enforcement.

== Investigation ==
=== Autopsy ===
An autopsy was performed the following day at 9:00 a.m. at the Office of the Chief Medical Examiner for the State of Maryland. Chief medical examiner David Fowler determined that West died of cardiac arrhythmia when his heart suddenly stopped beating exacerbated by dehydration, a heart condition, and excessively high temperatures. Neither asphyxia nor trauma from the fight were found to be causes of death. Additionally, West's urine tested positive for cocaine.

The medical examiner declined to release the results of the autopsy, even to the family, citing the incomplete and ongoing criminal investigation. Six months later at a press conference on December 10, 2013, the autopsy results were finally announced.

In May 2025, the Attorney General of Maryland published an investigative report concluding that West's death should be reclassified as a homicide and looked at for possible re-investigation. The audit did not provide details on how pathologists reached their conclusions in West's case, but generally found the possibility of racial and pro-police bias. Following the report's release, Maryland Governor Wes Moore signed an executive order directing the attorney general, in consultation with the Baltimore State's Attorney's Office and Maryland State Police, to reinvestigate the more than 40 cases mentioned in the report, including West's.

=== Internal investigation ===
Mayor Rawlings-Blake stated, “I have charged the Baltimore Police Department to conduct an internal investigation in an effort to further evaluate details surrounding this case and to hold anyone found of any wrongdoing accountable for their actions.” Eight city officers were suspended during dual investigations, an internal review by the police and a separate review by the State's Attorney's Office. Following routine guidelines, they were restricted to administrative assignments pending the outcome of the investigation.

In December 2013, city prosecutors concluded there was not enough evidence to file criminal charges against any of the officers. The State's Attorney's Office concluded that the use of batons, pepper spray, and physical force were justified in subduing West. State's Attorney Gregg L. Bernstein stated, “Mr. West ignored repeated verbal commands by the officers and fought with them over an extended period of time.” Cell phone video turned over by a witness verified that West was continually resisting arrest. City police hired an independent commission to conduct a third review that also confirmed the officers’ innocence.

== Impact ==
=== Family reaction ===
Every Wednesday since the death of Tyrone West on Thursday, July 18, 2013, his sister Tawanda Jones has led family members and supporters in weekly demonstration to keep the spotlight on her brother. Beginning on Wednesday, July 24, 2013, a prayer vigil was held by the community at the intersection, the weekly gathering continuing to the present time under the name West Wednesdays. The family of West alleged that some of the officers in the case were also present during the death of Anthony Anderson on September 21, 2012, a Baltimore resident who died during a police encounter, but none of the officers were actually involved. On June 23, 2014, the family of Tyrone West filed a multimillion-dollar federal lawsuit against 11 officers, the city of Baltimore's police commissioner Anthony W. Batts, and the police chief at Morgan State University. They cited assault, violation of civil rights, and wrongful death.

=== Changes in police procedure ===
At the conclusion of their internal investigation, the Baltimore Police stated, “While the criminal review of this difficult situation comes to an end, the internal evaluation of our tactics continues as we seek ways to improve.” Influenced by the deaths of Anthony Anderson in 2012 and Tyrone West in 2013, the police department created a reform model to improve training and the investigation of in-custody deaths. The case also influenced change in department policy including limiting physical exertion during heat warnings, placing suspects in a sitting position after being handcuffed, and the use of tasers to subdue subjects with non-lethal force. Plainclothes officers patrolling North Baltimore were discontinued and police in uniform with much greater experience and minimum requirements were recruited to patrol.

=== Independent investigation ===
In 2014, Mayor Stephanie Rawlings-Blake commissioned another review of the case. The independent review board was chaired by James K. Stewart and five doctors. They unanimously determined in August 2014 that West died suddenly while engaged in an extended period of resisting a lawful arrest, that excessive force was not used and did not contribute to the death of Tyrone West, but that officers did not completely follow protocol. The board concluded that West died of cardiac arrhythmia due to cardiac conduction system abnormality aggravated by his struggle with police and dehydration during his restraint. The extreme environmental temperatures and heat index in the low 100s were also cited as a potential factor.

The board also made 34 recommendations to improve training and officer accountability within the Baltimore Police Department. The panel determined that police did not follow basic policies and made tactical errors that potentially worsened the situation, including a lack of respect for motorists who are stopped in the neighborhood. The review identified the initial departure from protocol as the moment Chapman left his partner alone before backup arrived to begin lawfully searching the vehicle. Additionally, the pepper spray that incapacitated the officers should have been deployed when the suspect was at least three feet away, rather than in close proximity.

=== Ensuing protests ===
The friction between the Baltimore Police Department and inner-city Baltimore residents was finally thrust into the national spotlight with the death of Freddie Gray in April 2015. The growing tension in Baltimore, influence by the death of Tyrone West and more directly by Freddie Gray, bubbled over in 2015 resulting in demonstrations and rioting. The death of Freddie Gray prompted the U.S. Department of Justice to investigate the police department, determining in a report on August 10, 2016, that there existed cases of excessive use of force, unlawful arrests, and discrimination against African Americans. Tawanda Jones eventually met with the family of Freddie Gray and Attorney General Loretta Lynch who promised to look into the Tyrone West case.

== Controversy ==
=== Second autopsy ===
In 2015, the West family attorney Dwight Petit hired Dr. William Manion to conduct an independent forensic investigation of Tyrone West's autopsy. Manion, the chief of pathology at Memorial Hospital in Salem County, New Jersey, concluded that he died by suffocation as a result of the way police restrained him, calling it positional asphyxia. This contradicted earlier assertions that he died of a heart condition. Dr. Manion acknowledged the cardiac abnormality but did not believe it contributed to the death of West, submitting his findings in November 2015.

=== State's Attorney's office response ===
In 2013, Assistant State's Attorney Marilyn Mosby defeated State's Attorney Gregg L. Bernstein, winning the election over the attorney who failed to bring charges in the West case. Mosby was heralded as a champion for change after bringing charges against officers in the Freddie Gray case in 2015. On April 14, 2016, Mosby announced she would not reopen the investigation into the death of Tyrone West citing there is no additional evidence to contradict the previous findings. Mosby personally called Tawanda Jones to deliver the news. After three separate investigations confirmed the innocence of the officers involved, State's Attorney's spokeswoman Rochelle Ritchie announced that the case would not be reopened.

=== Third autopsy ===
Another independent autopsy was conducted in June 2016 by Adel Shaker, a former medical examiner in Alabama and Mississippi, Shaker also concluded that death was caused by positional asphyxia, suffocation from being restrained in a prone position.

=== Missing evidence ===
The drugs confiscated from the car driven by Tyrone West have been lost by the Baltimore Police Department. The evidence was discovered missing when attorneys for the West family subpoenaed the department to inspect the cocaine recovered at the scene, only to find it had disappeared.

=== National television ===
The case of Tyrone West gained national notoriety when his family appeared in the opening episode of the television series American Race. They confronted the show's host, ex-NBA star Charles Barkley, who has frequently expressed support for both the black community and urban police departments while hoping for both to work together.

== See also ==
- List of unarmed African Americans killed by law enforcement officers in the United States
- 2015 Baltimore protests
- Death of Freddie Gray
- List of killings by law enforcement officers in the United States, July 2013
