= Killing of Jeremy McDole =

2015 police shooting of paraplegic

The Killing of Jeremy McDole
- Screenshot of police officers pointing guns at Jeremy McDole, a paraplegic, moments before his death
- Date: September 23, 2015
- Time: 3:00 p.m.
- Location: Wilmington, Delaware, United States
- Type: Homicide by shooting, police killing
- Filmed by: Bystander
- Participants: Joseph Dellose (shooter); Thomas Lynch, James MacColl, Danny Silva (accompanying officers)
- Deaths: Jeremy McDole
- Burial: Cathedral Cemetery, Wilmington
- Inquiries: Delaware Department of Justice; Wilmington Police Department
- Charges: None
- Litigation: Lawsuit by McDole's family against the city of Wilmington settled for $1.5 million

Jeremy "Bam Bam" McDole was a 28-year-old African American paraplegic who was shot and killed by police in Wilmington, Delaware on September 23, 2015, at 3:00 pm. McDole was in a wheelchair at the time of the shooting. Police responded to a call about a man with a gun. The 911 caller later recanted her statements and has, to date, faced no penalties for the false statements made, which resulted in McDole's death. Camera footage from a bystander showed officers ordering McDole to drop his weapon and raise his hands, with McDole being shot after shuffling his hands near his waist area, but with a gun never being seen and evidence photos of the reported weapon only appearing 6 years after his murder. The Delaware state department cleared the officers of wrongdoing, but concluded that one of the involved officers had shown "extraordinarily poor" police work. A 2020 review by the Delaware Attorney General's Office came to the same conclusion. Both decided against filing any charges. The McDole family sued the city of Wilmington, and in January 2017, a settlement of $1.5 million was reached by the city.

== Killing ==
On September 23, 2015, at around 3:00 p.m., local police in Wilmington, Delaware responded to a 911 call about a man who had suffered a self-inflicted gunshot wound. The female caller told the dispatcher that a man had shot himself, still had the weapon, and had fallen onto the ground but was moving back into his wheelchair.

The officers who responded were Joseph Dellose, Thomas Lynch, James MacColl, and Danny Silva. Police arrived and found Jeremy McDole sitting in a wheelchair. After an officer shot McDole once, the incident escalated when police instructed McDole to raise his hands. A bystander said in reaction, "Put your hands up? But they shot his ass!" followed by McDole being shot 10 more times and killed by police.

According to police, a .38-caliber pistol was found on McDole after the shooting. Relatives of McDole have stated that he was unarmed. Video footage taken on a cellphone showed McDole shuffling in his chair and moving his hands while officers ordered him several times to put them up.

== Investigation ==
The shooting was investigated by both Delaware's Department of Justice's Office of Civil Rights and Public Trust and the Wilmington Police Department. The National Association for the Advancement of Colored People has stated that a special prosecutor is needed to ensure an impartial investigation.

A report of the incident was compiled by the Attorney General of Delaware Matt Denn, in which it was announced that the office had decided against criminal charges against the four Wilmington police officers involved, although investigators concluded one officer, Joseph Dellose, showed "extraordinarily poor" police work.

== Legal action ==
The Delaware Department of Justice had begun to compile a case against Dellose for a felony assault charge, but experts determined that he had acted within Delaware law and that prosecution would likely be unsuccessful. The report cleared the other three officers outright, noting they fired their weapons due to a subjective belief that greater harm would come to innocent parties if they did not.

Shortly after the announcement that none of the four officers would be charged, the lawyer for the McDole family announced that the lack of charges would not stop the federal civil suit around the death. In January 2017, a federal judge approved the city's $1.5 million settlement with McDole's family.

=== Arrest of Phyllis McDole ===
Subsequent to the shooting, Phyllis McDole, the mother of Jeremy, allegedly assaulted a woman she believed made the 911 call that lead to the death of her son. Phyllis McDole was arrested on charges of conspiracy, terroristic threats, and assault and subsequently released on bail. The state later agreed to drop the charges and she did not receive jail time after a plea deal was arranged for the charge of burglary.

== Response ==
After the release of the Attorney General report regarding the incident, the head of the Wilmington Police Officers' Union, Harold Bozeman, alleged that the report was only made for political gain. He stated, "The attorney general appears to be a man whose political ambition has trumped impartiality."

Local activists questioned police tactics that allowed for a shooting to occur while no threat to an officer was ever made. The African-American community in Wilmington called for a peaceful response. Of the four officers involved, three are white and one is Hispanic. The death of Jeremy McDole garnered the attention of Black Lives Matter activists on Twitter, and a local Black Lives Matter group joined McDole's family in leading subsequent marches and protests.

=== Marches and protests ===
In October 2015, a march was organized by the family of Jeremy McDole and other local residents. Additional demonstrations took place during the months of December 2015 and January 2016. Family of McDole stated they had not received official updates on the investigation, and called for the disruption of commercial activity and the resignation of city officials. During the protests against the murder of George Floyd in Wilmington, Delaware, McDole's mother spoke to the crowd who marched in memory of George Floyd and Jeremy McDole.
