= Killing of Lindani Myeni =

2021 killing of a Black man by Honolulu police officers

- Date: April 14, 2021; 5 years ago
- Location: Nuʻuanu, Hawaii
- Type: Police killing
- Cause: Gunshots
- Filmed by: Bodycam footage, Ring camera footage, a couple at the residence as witnesses
- Participants: Lindani Myeni (casualty); Three Honolulu Police Department officers
- Deaths: Lindani Myeni
- Injuries: Three Honolulu Police Department officers
- Charges: Mandani deceased and no charges will be filed against the three officers per Honolulu Prosecutor

On April 14, 2021, three officers from the Honolulu Police Department shot and killed 29-year-old Lindani Myeni fronting a home in Nuʻuanu, Honolulu County, Hawaii due to a misunderstanding by a guest at the B&B. Myeni was a Black South African who played professional rugby and had two young children. The shooting took place in a residence's driveway after apparent fighting with Honolulu police officers. All three police officers were injured, and one was hospitalized.

After the killing, Myeni's widow Lindsay Myeni filed a wrongful death lawsuit against the city of Honolulu, while Honolulu Prosecutor Steve Alm decided not to prosecute any of the involved officers after an investigation by his office. Later autopsy results show he suffered from a degenerative brain disease often found in American football players and other athletes subjected to repeated head trauma, commonly known as Chronic traumatic encephalopathy. This finding could help explain Lindani Myeni's bizarre behavior during the incident. On July 30th, 2025 the wrongful death was dismissed and the officers involved in the shooting were cleared.

== Background ==
Lindani Myeni was a Black South African man from the Zulu tribe, raised in the town of Empangeni in KwaZulu-Natal, who played professional rugby and had two young children. He was married to Lindsay Myeni, who grew up in Hawaii. The couple met at a hotel in Durban, where Lindani was playing an away game of rugby and Lindsay had a layover during a worldwide Christian missionary trip. Their wedding was 18 months later, and they moved to the United States in January 2020 because of Lindsay's real estate career. Initially living in Tampa, Florida, the couple disliked the racial disparities there and did not feel safe as a mixed-race couple. They subsequently moved to Denver, where Lindani joined the Glendale Merlins while waiting for a work permit, but was arrested and released without charges while traveling with the Merlins in Austin, Texas, and was later stopped by police while walking to rugby practice in Denver. The couple moved to Hawaii as a result, arriving in February 2021 with their two children. Lindsay began work selling real estate, while Lindani was a stay-at-home dad.

According to Lindsay Myeni, the family were touring Oahu on April 14, 2021, the day Lindani Myeni was killed. Lindsay Myeni told The New York Times that while the family was driving home after visiting Hānaiakamalama, they stopped at a roadside stand selling wood carvings, and Lindani became fixated on a large carved fish hook which the carver told them was a source of spiritual protection. According to Lindsay, they did not purchase the hook because it was too expensive at $250, but Lindani continued to talk about it even after they arrived at home, saying that he felt a need for spiritual protection and that he wanted to go back and buy the hook. He felt uneasy and went for a drive alone to clear his head.

In Lindsay Myeni's interview with the city's Medical Examiner, disclosed by Alm's report, she said her husband didn't have known health problems. She denied any significant depression or suicidal ideations. However, she mentioned that Myeni was "excited and stressed" about several things, including "discovered who he thought was his father was his uncle, and who he thought was his uncle was his father." She said that would make Myeni potentially King; however, it was stressful for him to realize that his family had lied to him his entire life.

According to the report, Lindsay said Myeni and their children had a "spiritual day" on April 14, 2021, visiting various locations in Oahu, including Hānaiakamalama. In Laie, Myeni even baptized himself again in the ocean. Then, around 19:15 to 19:30, Myeni left for a drive to "clear his mind," and she spoke to him at 19:52, and he was "on his way home." The Medical Examiner noted that she didn't comment why Myeni may have been at the residence, only stating he was "5 blocks away from home".

== Earlier encounter with police ==
According to Alm's investigation, about 20 minutes before the shooting, Myeni approached the scene of an unauthorized entry into a motor vehicle, talking to several investigating police officers and the victim. The victim told Myeni to go away. He asked one of the officers for money for food and wanted to get in the back seat of a police car. Myeni told another officer that he needed help contacting someone but then realized that he had his own phone. Myeni then drove in his car to a nearby house and followed a couple inside. Alm commented that "several of (Myeni’s) statements and actions were strange, even bizarre”.

Honolulu Police Department (HPD) released the police bodycam regarding this encounter on October 12, 2021, as described by Hawaii News Now. The body camera video starts with an officer who just arrived on the scene about 7:40 p.m. He was startled because Myeni tried to get into the patrol car. Myeni said to that officer, "I was walking this way, and I thought I should get in. I thought wrong. I'm sorry." The officer asked him to get away from the car. Myeni walked up to the officer again after the officer left the police vehicle. Officer asked, "Can I help you? ", Myeni replied "I was driven by a car and got me here," The officer then told Myeni to stay 6 feet and wear a face mask. Myeni went to his car to retrieve a face mask and returned to the officer said, "I need to find a boat or some way to meet people." He said he was looking for someone, but HPD bleeped out the details of this person. The officer seemed confused and asked Myeni if he could call that person. Myeni then got his phone and started calling as he left. Then, Myeni drove up and engaged the officer again, "Bye. Thank you," he said, the officer waved back and said, "OK, thank you." The officer made a report about the encounter.

The attorney for Myeni's family, James Bickerton, declined to comment. He said he was waiting for HPD to turn over the unredacted video. During an earlier press conference reported by Star Advertiser, Bickerton dismissed the idea that Myeni may have been in an altered state of mind — including suggestions that he was suffering from mental health issues or had taken drugs that night. Bickerton said there was no “sign of any disturbance or acting strange.”

== Shooting ==
At 8:09 p.m. on April 14, 2021, a person in Nuʻuanu called the Honolulu Police Department (HPD) to say that someone was entering the caller's house. The call lasted nine minutes and 47 seconds. Five minutes into the call, at which point Myeni seems to have left the house, three HPD police officers arrived. They approached him in the dark driveway and ordered him to get on the ground, and he subsequently attacked them while asking twice who they were. The police deployed a Taser. As Myeni continued to fight, they shot and killed him. One of the officers was hospitalized after he sustained facial fractures, a concussion, and bodily injuries. Another officer sustained multiple bodily injuries, and the third sustained a concussion and multiple abrasions to his body.

== Honolulu Police Department statement ==
The day after the killing, Chief of Police Susan Ballard told the press that officers responded to a reported burglary. Myeni had exhibited "erratic and odd behavior" inside the residence before assaulting three police officers outside. When the first officer arrived and ordered Myeni to get on the ground, she said Myeni charged at him, punching him several times. Another officer tried to intervene, and the third officer tried non-lethal force first, deployed a Taser, which didn't stop him. The first officer fired a single round, but Myeni "continued and straddled" another officer, and that's when "Officer two" fired three rounds. She added that all three officers had been sent to the hospital and that the officers' shooting of Myeni was justified because "(Myeni) seriously injured the officers and their lives were in jeopardy." The department released a recording of the 911 call to the press, along with footage from police body cameras at the scene.

Two days after the killing, Acting Deputy Chief Allan Nagata said that the three involved officers "were very brave and they fought for their lives," adding that the shooting "was not a case of overreaction."

== Wrongful death lawsuit ==
On April 21, 2021, Lindsay Myeni filed a wrongful death claim against the city. Her lawyer, James Bickerton, subsequently conducted depositions of witnesses, including the couple and the owner of the home. Bickerton was able to obtain more video footage with a subpoena as a result of the claim, including more body camera footage and a Ring video recording from the residence. On July 30th, 2025 the wrongful death was dismissed and the officers involved in the shooting were cleared.

=== Subpoenaed Ring camera footage ===
The redacted Ring camera footage, provided by Bickerton and described by Honolulu Civil Beat, depicts two cars pulling up to the residence at about 8 p.m. The couple walks into the house, and Lindani Myeni follows, wearing a face mask and a traditional Zulu headband called an umqhele. Myeni removes his shoes before entering the house, and is inside for about 40 seconds. He then backs out of the house while one of the couple who called 911 can be heard saying that someone has broken in. According to Bickerton, the caller said during their deposition that they were initially pretending to call the police but then decided to do so for real. Bickerton told Civil Beat that the Ring footage supports his theory that Myeni intended to enter the International Society for Krishna Consciousness temple adjacent to the property, saying that the Zulu headband he was wearing would be typical attire for a church or temple. Lindsay Myeni additionally said that she believed Myeni had intended to enter the Hare Krishna temple. While in an earlier interview with Hawaii News Now, Lindsay said she didn't know why Myeni was there but he wouldn’t burglarize.

Scot Brower, a lawyer representing the couple and the house owner, disputed the idea that Myeni was looking for a temple. He said the ring camera was motion-sensitive and only record when movements occurred outside the home's front door, in fact, Myeni was inside for several minutes, during which Myeni behaved strangely, walking down the hallway and rummaging through things in rooms, claimed to own the home, and said "I have a video on you. You know why I’m here." He acknowledged that there was no recording to support his claims. He said although English was not the couple's primary language, they are fluent in English. Brower additionally noted that the couple worried that they were targeted because of their ethnicity due to Xenophobia and racism related to the COVID-19 pandemic.

Alm, Honolulu Prosecutor, said that no facts were supporting Myeni was looking for the temple. Alm elaborated "If in fact Mr. Myeni was looking for the temple, it would have taken him maybe a few seconds after getting into the house to realize oh, no temple, wrong place, turn around, leave." Alm additionally said that Myeni told the 911 caller “I have videos of you. You know why I’m here.” He then said he lived in the house, and a cat in the house was his. Alm said Myeni stayed inside for five minutes even though the 911 caller asked him to leave several times and told him they were calling the police. Alm said Myeni told the caller that he is not afraid of the police and he was on a hunt, on safari, which the couple interpreted as a threat and said that they were the hunted prey and he was the hunter.

In his documents for the press, Alm also enclosed a statement from the president of the Hare Krishna temple. The president claimed, "we do not know Mr. Myeni and have no information concerning him or the events of April 14. We are not aware that he has ever been to our temple or had any intention to come to our temple on April 14.". He stated that the temple was closed during the time of the incident.

=== 911 call audio ===
In audio from the 911 call as described by Civil Beat, the caller tells Myeni to "please leave". Bickerton claims that the caller's spouse can be heard saying “we have no temple” in the background. The caller tells the dispatcher that Myeni identified himself as Lindani or Linden per New York Times, that he said he was from South Africa, and that he was not armed or shouting. The caller is audibly crying for much of the phone call. In the Ring camera footage, Myeni is seen leaving while repeatedly apologizing and saying "I know you guys though. Can I see your phone". The caller tells the dispatcher that they are too afraid to go outside. As Officers arrive, the caller directs them to Myeni.

Scot Brower disputed the claim that the spouse of the caller can be heard mentioning a temple in the background. He additionally noted that Myeni went in the house without any permission or consent.

=== Body camera footage ===
In body camera footage as described by Civil Beat, an officer points a handgun and a flashlight toward Myeni in the dark, and shouts at him twice to "get on the ground". Myeni begins to fight with the officers, causing the camera to shake, while asking twice who they are. Another officer deploys a taser as Myeni continues to fight. Someone yells "shoot him!", and one shot can be heard. Another officer says "fuck you" and three more shots are fired as the officer says "Police!"

== Prosecutorial response ==
In April, Honolulu Prosecutor Steve Alm announced that his office was investigating the police response to the incident.

=== On the shooting ===
On July 1, 2021, The New York Times reported that Alm had decided not to prosecute any of the three involved officers. Alm said that the officers' use of deadly force was justified. He noted that the officers tried to use multiple non-lethal, non-deadly force techniques to control Mr. Myeni before they used their service firearms. Alm said that Myeni attacked the officers immediately as they arrived at the scene (identified by Alm as Officer one, two, and three), hitting Officer one. Officer three used his Taser, but it was ineffective. Myeni attacked Officer three, and Officer two tried to stop him by hand but failed. Myeni charged at Officer one again. The Officer shot Myeni in his chest, but that failed to subdue him; Myeni then tackled him and began punching him repeatedly on the ground. Alm said Officer two then drew his weapon and ordered Myeni to stop. When Myeni kept punching Officer one in the face, Officer two fired three times, striking Myeni twice in the torso and once in the leg. Alm said that both officers were justified because officer one feared for his life and Officer two was afraid Officer one would be killed, or that Myeni would gain control of Officer one's weapon. In the prosecutor's documents that he gave to the media, he pointed out that Myeni committed the offense of unauthorized entry in a dwelling in the second degree and the offense of assault against a law enforcement officer in the first degree. Finally, Alm gave a remark saying all three police officers were sent to the emergency room after the incidents with injuries, including one who was seriously injured and hadn't returned to work at the time of the press release. He noted that Myeni was unarmed, and stated that his office "did not see any evidence that race played any part in this entire incident."

=== Criticisms ===
The New York Times quoted Bridget G. Morgan-Bickerton, a lawyer for Myeni's widow Lindsay Myeni, who said that she was "very disappointed" in the Prosecutor's decision. Morgan-Bickerton said that Alm's investigation had not addressed the fact that the officers did not identify themselves as police before shooting Myeni, stating that this was because Myeni was Black, and noting that Lindsay Myeni's wrongful death lawsuit against the city would continue. Alm responded that the officers' uniforms would have been clearly visible and that Myeni would have been able to see them because of the bright streetlights in the area, and therefore there was no need for the officers to verbally identify themselves as police.

== Autopsy report ==
According to an autopsy report provided by Alm's office, the toxicology found the presence of a marijuana component with metabolites in his blood. Still, the autopsy report offered no opinion concerning the psychological or physiological effect of marijuana on Myeni’s state of mind or his behavior. The Medical Examiner noted in the report that they proposed a Chronic Traumatic Encephalopathy consultation through Boston University but it was declined by Myeni's family saying, "make him look bad." The Medical Examiner concluded the cause of death was multiple gunshot wounds.

On February 10, 2023, an addendum to the autopsy report of Lindani Myeni revealed that he suffered from stage three chronic traumatic encephalopathy (CTE), according to the Associated Press. CTE is a degenerative brain disease that can only be diagnosed posthumously and is commonly found in people with repeated head injuries. Experts say it's alarming for someone as young as Myeni to have such a critical case of CTE, with stage four being the most severe level. Lindsay Myeni said she was shocked to learn of the CTE diagnosis.

Honolulu's medical examiner, Dr. Masahiko Kobayashi, who performed the autopsy on Lindani Myeni, said he suspected CTE after learning of Myeni's past in contact sports and behavior. As a result, he ordered the test to be a part of a complete understanding of the circumstances surrounding Myeni's death. Kobayashi said he hoped the CTE finding might provide a clearer picture of what led to Myeni's death.

== Public response ==
=== In US ===
Locally, the killing of Myeni led to some gatherings and small protests. A Back Da Blue rally was held on April 25 Kapolei, Mililani, Kane'ohe District Parks to Kapiʻolani Regional Park in Waikiki following the shooting, showing support to HPD.

=== In South Africa ===
Lindani Myeni's body was sent to South Africa for his funeral. A group of youth from the African National Congress met the coffin at O. R. Tambo International Airport in Johannesburg, waving a banner that read "Black Lives Matter" and depicted his face. Nonhlanhla Khoza, who was present as part of a delegation from the KwaZulu-Natal provincial government, called for justice and said that the killing of Myeni had "diminished the little hope that there will be a sudden change in police attitudes after the globally reported murder of George Floyd". She described the actions of the police officers who killed Myeni as reminiscent of the Atlantic slave trade and lynching of Black people in the United States as well as the apartheid security forces in South Africa, expressed a loss of faith in the Honolulu Police Department, and stated that "we have confidence in U.S. President Joe Biden, that as crusader for human rights and justice, he will ensure that justice will finally prevail".

On May 6, 2021, a memorial service for Myeni was held at Empangeni Rugby Club. Sihle Zikalala, the Premier of KwaZulu-Natal, delivered a speech calling for justice for Myeni.

At Myeni's funeral, which was held in eSikhawini on May 8, 2021, Lindsay Myeni expressed a desire to raise the couple's children in South Africa, saying that she didn't "want to raise kids that are considered black in America, where clearly it's not safe" and asking the South African government for help gaining citizenship. The government of KwaZulu-Natal stated that it would support Myeni's family in finding justice, with government official Neliswa Nkonyeni claiming that Myeni's death was racially motivated and stating that “to understand the racial disparities in the USA, we must look beyond its borders and its institutionalised racism [...] We must interrogate its violent interventionist approach in other countries in the name of exporting democracy." Hlengiwe Mavimbela, local minister for Arts, Culture and Sport, also attended. The funeral, along with recordings of the 911 call, was broadcast in South African media and Myeni's death was compared to police killings of other African immigrants to America such as those of Amadou Diallo, Ousmane Zongo, and Alfred Olango. Myeni was buried in eSikhaleni, KwaZulu-Natal.

== See also ==
- Killing of Iremamber Sykap
