= List of killings by law enforcement officers in the United States, April 2021 =

This is a list of people reported killed by non-military law enforcement officers in the United States in April 2021, whether in the line of duty or not, and regardless of reason or method. The listing documents the occurrence of a death, making no implications regarding wrongdoing or justification on the part of the person killed or officer involved. Killings are arranged by date of the incident that caused death. Different death dates, if known, are noted in the description. The table below lists 101 people.

== April 2021 ==
Date	Name (age) of deceased	Race	Location	Description
2021-04-30	Terrance Maurice Parker (36)	Black	Washington, D.C.	Police were called to an apartment for a domestic dispute. Bodycam video showed Parker seated on a bed with a phone in his left hand, and the officer asked, "Sir, what do you have there?" Parker removed a gun from his right pocket and pointed it in the air, and police shot him three times. A gun was recovered from the scene.
2021-04-30	Hanad Abdiaziz (25)	Black	Kansas City, Missouri	
2021-04-30	Aaron Chase Sparks (27)	White	Azle, Texas	
2021-04-29	Joe Robideau (21)	White	Troy, Missouri	
2021-04-29	Alfredo Aceves (64)	Hispanic	Lake Los Angeles, California	
2021-04-28	Oscar Herrera (32)	White	Reading, Michigan	
2021-04-27	Dalton James Gerrit Kooiman (20)	White	Bakersfield, California	
2021-04-27	Carlos Lopez-Melendez (50)	Hispanic	Fullerton, California	A man suspected in a series of drive-by shootings in Los Angeles that killed two people and wounded a third was killed after a standoff with police in Fullerton.
2021-04-27	Chase Brewer (47)	White	Crystal Springs, Mississippi	An off-duty DEA agent killed Brewer after he trespassed on the agent's property. The agent claimed Brewer had a rock, but none were found nearby. The agent was arrested for murder but not indicted.
2021-04-26	Daniel Diaz Jr. (40)	Hispanic	El Paso, Texas	
2021-04-24	Richard Solitro (34)	White	Los Angeles, California	Solitro was wearing body armor when he was shot and killed by police.
2021-04-24	Benjamin Ridley (29)	White	Webbers Falls, Oklahoma	Police officers were attempting to arrest Ridley for outstanding warrants. They shot and killed him, claiming he was armed with a handgun.
2021-04-24	Marvin Veiga (32)	Black	Nashville, Tennessee	A Nashville officer shot and killed a man who charged at the officer with butcher knives in the city's Bordeaux neighborhood.
2021-04-23	Tory Casey (41)	Black	Rosenberg, Texas	Casey had a history of mental illness and started shooting into the air and threatening customers at a laundromat. When officers arrived, Casey refused to put down his gun, and was shot and killed.
2021-04-23	Edward Robbesom (52)	Unknown	Casa Grande, Arizona	Police responded to a report of a shooting and found Robbesom standing in the street holding a gun, over a woman he had allegedly just shot in the chest. Police say Robbesom refused to drop his gun and was shot dead.
2021-04-23	Michael Lee McClure (26)	White	Billings, Montana	Police in Laurel, Montana were called to investigate a suspicious couple and were led on a pursuit for several miles which resulted in the driver crashing in a residential cul-de-sac in Billings. One suspect was apprehended during the foot pursuit but the other was able to barricade himself in a home. After an hours-long standoff, police moved to apprehend the suspect, but the suspect (armed with a handgun) was killed in an exchange of gunfire with police.
2021-04-22	Richard Quintana (37)	Hispanic	Colorado Springs, Colorado	
2021-04-21	Steven John Olson (59)	White	Escondido, California	Escondido police officers responded to a call of a man hitting cars with a metal object near the intersection of 2nd Ave and Broadway. In a critical incident debriefing, Escondido Police Chief Ed Varso provided more details on the incident; "The male immediately advanced on the officer while holding the same metal tool in a threatening manner. The officer gave multiple commands to drop the tool as well as several use-of-force warnings. The male continued to advance on the officer who was backing away and he was ultimately shot." The suspect was transferred to a local hospital and later pronounced dead.
2021-04-21	Andrew Brown Jr. (42)	Black	Elizabeth City, North Carolina	Brown was shot and killed by a North Carolina deputy executing a search warrant. A district attorney who viewed the bodycam video made a statement before a judge saying Brown backed up his car and made contact with a police officer, and then drove forward and made contact with another police officer. He said police, "shouted commands and tried to open the car before any shots were fired".
2021-04-21	Phet Gouvonvong (31)	Asian	Worcester, Massachusetts	Gouvonvong called 911 and claimed to have a rifle and a bomb. Police tried to negotiate with Gouvonvong, who appeared heavily armed and was carrying what looked like an assault rifle. Gouvonvong was shot after he became agitated and made "furtive" movements toward police. Fake explosives and a handgun were found on Gouvonvong.
2021-04-20	Ma'Khia Bryant (16)	Black	Columbus, Ohio	Bryant was shot by a Columbus Division of Police officer after police received a call about an attempted stabbing. Video showed Bryant shot as she was lunging at another, fleeing individual while holding a knife, and showed the officer repeatedly yell "get down" before firing.
2021-04-20	Brian Deleon (37)	Hispanic	San Antonio, Texas	Deleon shot and killed Bobby Borrego. Police were called to the scene where they shot and killed Deleon.
2021-04-20	Terry Wayne Bishop (28)	White	San Antonio, Texas	Bishop, who police claim was carrying a gun on a San Antonio bus, was shot and killed by VIA Transit police officers. There were between four and six other passengers on the bus at the time, but no one else was injured.
2021-04-20	Name Withheld	White	Lakewood, Colorado	
2021-04-19	Mario Gonzalez (26)	Hispanic	Alameda, California	Gonzalez was in a park with two Walgreens baskets. He calmly spoke with the officers before they asked him to produce his name and identification. Gonzalez did not produce an ID, and an officer stated, "Please put your hand behind your back ... please stop resisting us." The officers pushed Gonzalez onto the ground into wood chips, placing a knee on his back and leaving it there for four minutes as Gonzalez gasped for air. Gonzalez lost consciousness, at which point the officers rolled him over, performed CPR, and delivered Narcan. He was pronounced dead later at the hospital.
2021-04-19	Antonio Cantu (52)	Hispanic	Aransas Pass, Texas	Police were sent to investigate reports of a suspicious man acting erratically. According to police, Cantu started fighting with officers and was detained in an officer's vehicle. Cantu got out of the police vehicle, took out a gun, and shot at officers. Officers returned fire and killed Cantu.
2021-04-19	Doward Sylleen Baker (39)	Black	Dothan, Alabama	The incident started when police pulled Baker's vehicle over for not having a license plate displayed. Baker attempted to exit his car and flee the scene. He attempted to shoot at police and was tasered before he was fatally shot.
2021-04-19	Unknown (27)	Unknown	Detroit, Michigan	Police shot and killed a man who drove through a crime scene. Officers claim the man was firing shots from his vehicle. Police have released dash cam footage of the shooting.
2021-04-19	Edgar Luis Tirado Jr. (28)	White	Dallas, Texas	Officers shot Edgar Luis Tirado as he brandished a replica firearm. Police claim this replica had been used in a series of robberies that day. Tirado had been diagnosed with bipolar disorder in his 20's. At the time of the shooting, his parents were attempting to get him admitted to a long-term mental health facility, but were finding it very difficult due to Tirado being homeless and therefore having no fixed address. Edgar was a veteran of the US Air Force. Police have released helicopter footage recorded prior to Tirado's death.
2021-04-18	Bradley Michael Olsen (30)	White	Burnsville, Minnesota	At about 3 p.m., a man was killed in an exchange of gunfire with police officers in the Minneapolis suburb of Burnsville. Police were in pursuit of the man for an alleged string of carjackings and shot the man during a standoff and gunfight on a highway.
2021-04-18	Ryan Oneal Williams (31)	Black	Fort Worth, Texas	Police shot and killed a man who was suspected of carjacking. Bodycam video showed that Williams ignored multiple warnings to put down his gun, and was shot when he aimed his gun at the officer.
2021-04-17	Smoky Lynn Crockett (60)	White	Fort Lupton, Colorado	
2021-04-17	Bradley Michael Rose (29)	Unknown race	Kingman, Arizona	
2021-04-17	Larry Jenkins (52)	Black	Winter Haven, Florida	Police were called to Jenkins' apartment after he fired a gun. Police told Jenkins to show his hands but he refused, and police fired tasers twice at Jenkins after seeing his hand on a gun in his pocket. Police shot Jenkins with a rifle when he pulled the handgun from his pocket.
2021-04-17	Matthew Harry (26)	Asian	Hayward, California	According to the Alameda County Sheriff's Office, a man with a loaded gun was shot and killed by deputies. Matthew was on parole and homeless at the time of the shooting.
2021-04-16	Robert Douglas Delgado (46)	Unknown	Portland, Oregon	Delgado was waving a gun in a public park, and did not comply with police to drop his gun. He was shot from a distance of 90 ft (27 m). The gun was discovered to be a replica.
2021-04-16	Juan James Cordova (51)	Hispanic	Albuquerque, New Mexico	
2021-04-16	Sammie Joe Barbosa (33)	Hispanic	Texas (San Antonio)	During a traffic stop, two men were shot and killed by an officer after the passenger fired at the officer. A third passenger, a 22-year-old woman, was shot in the torso and subsequently taken to the hospital.
2021-04-16	Alex Anthony Garcia (25)	Hispanic	Texas (San Antonio)	During a traffic stop, two men were shot and killed by an officer after the passenger fired at the officer. A third passenger, a 22-year-old woman, was shot in the torso and subsequently taken to the hospital.
2021-04-15	Innes Lee Jr. (25)	Black	Cleveland, Ohio	Lee was wanted on a murder warrant. Bodycam video shows the officer chase Lee into a backyard and tell him not to reach into his pockets. Lee struggles with the officer, and is shot when he is seen holding a gun. A gun was located on the ground near Lee.
2021-04-15	Joe Gomez (46)	Hispanic	San Antonio, Texas	Police shot and killed Gomez who, officers claim, began firing indiscriminately at people outside San Antonio International Airport in Texas. No one except Gomez was harmed. Gomez was known to have a history of mental illness.
2021-04-15	Jeffrey Guy Sacks Jr. (26)	White	North Lauderdale, Florida	Sacks was seen walking into a budget clothes store with a knife. Customers inside the store called 911, saying Sacks had used the knife to cut himself. When police arrived, Sacks exited the store. Officers claim Sacks was threatening to further hurt himself and the attending police deputy. Still holding the knife, Sacks approached the Deputy, who shot and killed him. Sacks was diagnosed at 15-years-old with schizoaffective disorder. A video shot by a witness has been turned over to investigators.
2021-04-15	Roderick Inge (29)	Black	Tuscaloosa, Alabama	
2021-04-15	Victor Ivan Barron (22)	Hispanic	Roswell, New Mexico	
2021-04-14	Lindani Myeni (29)	Black	Honolulu, Hawaii	The occupants of a home called 911 after Myeni entered their home, sat down, and took off his shoes. When police arrived, bodycam video showed Myeni in his car near the home. He then got out of his car and walked toward an officer, while a second officer ordered Myeni to get on the ground. Myeni did not comply and charged at the first officer. Two officers tried to get Myeni off the first officer and deployed a Taser, which was not effective. Police then fired guns at Myeni. Myeni, who was from South Africa, was dressed in traditional Zulu clothing, and his wife believes he may have mistook the house for a nearby temple.
2021-04-14	Marcelo Garcia (46)	Hispanic	Houston, Texas	A man in a mental health crisis and holding a knife was killed after being shocked with a Taser and then shot several times by a Harris County Sheriff's Office deputy.
2021-04-14	Jacob Wood (28)	White	Mars Hill, Maine	Wood was shot and killed by deputy Isaac Ward.
2021-04-13	Lindani Myeni (29)	Black	Honolulu, Hawaii	
2021-04-13	Peyton Ham (16)	White	Leonardtown, Maryland	A Maryland State Police trooper fatally shot Ham after responding to reports of an armed man, which were made by Ham himself. According to the state attorney, Ham was holding a BB gun that resembled a real firearm when a trooper shot him. The trooper then shot again after Ham allegedly pulled a pocket knife out.
2021-04-13	Thomas Andrew Bunde (58)	White	Garden City, Idaho	
2021-04-13	Keith Robert Tafoya (67)	White	Saltlick Township, Pennsylvania	
2021-04-13	Christopher Templo Marquez (36)	Hispanic	San Diego, California	
2021-04-12	Matthew Zadok Williams (35)	Black	Decatur, Georgia	Police had been called to Williams' condominium unit, where they encountered him holding a knife. Bodycam video showed Williams' repeatedly instructed to drop his knife and being shot while chasing an officer.
2021-04-12	Miles Jackson (27)	Black	Columbus, Ohio	Jackson was in the emergency room at St. Ann's Hospital in Westerville, Ohio, when officers attempted to search him "in preparation for a custody exchange over warrants he had out for his arrest". When one officer felt a gun in Jackson's waistband, video showed Jackson struggle with the two officers, and Jackson and an officer fell to the floor. While one officer tried to pull Jackson's hand from his waistband, the second officer fired a stun gun at Jackson. Jackson then fired his gun, and one officer returned fire before both officers took cover. Officers "shouted for minutes at Jackson...to raise his hands and put them on his head", and a stun gun was deployed a second time. When Jackson fired his gun again, police returned fire.
2021-04-12	Pier Alexander Shelton (28)	Black	Bremen, Georgia	Shelton and his cousin refused to stop their car for police, and during the chase shots were fired at police, wounding three. After the car crashed, they continued to shoot at police and Shelton was shot and killed.
2021-04-12	Anthony Thompson Jr. (17)	Black	Knoxville, Tennessee	Police responded to Austin-East Magnet High School for a domestic abuse investigation involving Thompson, and located him in a bathroom. Bodycam video showed officers attempting to handcuff Thompson when a handgun Thompson was holding in his pocket discharged. Police then shot and killed him.
2021-04-11	Daunte Wright (20)	Black/White	Brooklyn Center, Minnesota	In a suburb of Minneapolis, an officer with the Brooklyn Center police department pulled Daunte Wright over during a traffic stop. Wright had an outstanding warrant and fled when officers attempted an arrest. He was shot by an officer while getting back into his car. Wright drove several blocks before crashing into another vehicle. He was pronounced dead at the scene of the crash.
2021-04-11	Crystal Jean Alcozer (34)	Hispanic	Del Rio, Texas	
2021-04-10	Joshua Michael Johnson (31)	White	Salt Lake City, Utah	
2021-04-10	Rescue Eram (31)	Pacific Islander	San Marcos, Texas	According to police, officers shot and killed a man after he charged at them with an object that looked similar to a knife or other object. Rescue was born and grew up in Guam.
2021-04-10	Faustin Guetigo (27)	Black	Rockford, Illinois	Guetigo's wife called police after being assaulted by him. According to police bodycam, an officer found Guetigo outside his home and tried to place him in custody, which he resisted. After a struggle, Guetigo ran inside the home. Police entered the home, and Guetigo walked up the basement stairs holding an object later identified as a metal pipe. Police instructed Guetigo to show his hands and drop the object, before firing several times. An officer was knocked unconscious by the pipe. Guetigo died in the hospital.
2021-04-10	Joshua Mitchell (30)	Unknown	Metairie, Louisiana	According to police, Mitchell was shot and killed by Jefferson Parish Sheriff's deputies after he pointed a gun at them.
2021-04-10	Guillermo Amezcua (48)	Unknown	San Fernando, California	According to police, a man was shot and killed by police after he opened fire on them.
2021-04-09	DeShund Tanner (31)	Black	Georgetown, Kentucky	Tanner was in a shopping center allegedly attempting to break into cars, and fled on foot when police arrived. He twice tried to carjack a vehicle while fleeing, and was shot when he allegedly brandished a gun.
2021-04-09	David William Determan (52)	White	Lena, Illinois	
2021-04-09	Paige Pierce Schmidt (26)	White	Hotchkiss, Colorado	
2021-04-09	Douglas C. Barton (50)	White	Bethel Township, Miami County, Ohio	According to the US Marshals, Barton was shot and killed by Marshals after he fired a weapon at them.
2021-04-09	Gabriel Munoz Jr. (40)	Unknown	Whitewater, California	According to police, a Riverside County Sheriff's Department deputy shot and killed a man after he charged with a tire iron.
2021-04-08	Charles Kevell Green (33)	Black	Timmonsville, South Carolina	
2021-04-08	Raheem Reeder (28)	Unknown	Tallahassee, Florida	A Tallahassee Police officer shot and killed a man who allegedly raised a gun toward the officer.
2021-04-08	Zaydin J. Dudra (20)	White	Taylorville, Illinois	Dudra and Shoot were killed when an intoxicated Illinois Capitol Police investigator crashed into their vehicle as he attempted to pass another car on Illinois Route 48.
2021-04-08	Haley Anne Shoot (19)	White	Taylorville, Illinois	Dudra and Shoot were killed when an intoxicated Illinois Capitol Police investigator crashed into their vehicle as he attempted to pass another car on Illinois Route 48.
2021-04-07	Sam Gillings (33)	Black	Miami, Florida	Gillings, a pedestrian, was struck and killed by a Miami-Dade Sheriff's Office vehicle in a lane intended for emergency vehicles on the Miami-Dade busway.
2021-04-07	James Alexander (24)	Black	Philadelphia, Pennsylvania	Alexander had an outstanding warrant, and was a passenger in a car stopped by police. Alexander was instructed to step out of the car, and he allegedly pulled a gun on police and started firing. He then stepped out of the car and continued firing at police. Five officers returned fire, and Alexander was pronounced dead at the hospital.
2021-04-07	Roger Allen (44)	Black	Daly City, California	Allen was a passenger in a parked truck when police stopped to offer assistance with a damaged tire. Allen was shot in the chest by a Daly City police officer after allegedly pointing a fake gun at an officer's face.
2021-04-07	Dominique Williams (32)	Black	Maryland (Takoma Park)	An off-duty Pentagon Police officer shot and killed two men who were allegedly breaking into a vehicle, during which he claims they attempted to run him over. Both men were shot in the back, and security camera video shows the officer firing at the vehicle after it had already passed him. The officer was charged with two counts of second-degree murder, as well as second-degree attempted murder of the vehicle's owner.
2021-04-07	James Lionel Johnson (38)	Black	Maryland (Takoma Park)	An off-duty Pentagon Police officer shot and killed two men who were allegedly breaking into a vehicle, during which he claims they attempted to run him over. Both men were shot in the back, and security camera video shows the officer firing at the vehicle after it had already passed him. The officer was charged with two counts of second-degree murder, as well as second-degree attempted murder of the vehicle's owner.
2021-04-06	Devin Wyteagle Kuykendall (26)	Native American	Redding, California	According to police, a man carrying a rifle was shot and killed by police after a car chase.
2021-04-06	Stephanie Nicole Voikin (40)	White	Miami, Florida	According to the Miami-Dade Police Department, a woman was shot and killed after opening fire on officers evicting her from her apartment.
2021-04-06	Tyler R. Green (23)	White	Oneonta, New York	Green was shot twice in the chest and killed by officer Ralph Pajerski after threatening a woman and a child with a knife. Green was a veteran of the Army National Guard.
2021-04-06	Fantahun Girma Woldesenbet (38)	Black	Frederick, Maryland	A United States Navy hospital corpsman shot and injured two people in Frederick before driving to and breaching the gate at Fort Detrick, where fort police shot and killed him.
2021-04-05	Iremamber Sykap (16)	Pacific Islander	Honolulu, Hawaii	Sykap was shot five times and killed by police after he drove a stolen car in a chase into a canal.
2021-04-05	Roy Jackel Jr. (41)	White	Buena Vista Township, New Jersey	According to New Jersey Attorney General Gurbir Grewal, Jackel was involved in a car crash, then stole a police cruiser from a responding officer, ensuing in a chase and "encounter" in which the officer shot and killed him.
2021-04-05	Abdou Jallow (55)	Black	New York, New York	
2021-04-05	Silas Lambert (25)	Unknown	Anadarko, Oklahoma	Lambert was shot and killed by officers responding to an overdose patient.
2021-04-04	Desmon Montez Ray (28)	Black	Birmingham, Alabama	Officers responded to a call about a domestic disturbance inside a vehicle. Officers attempted to stop Ray's vehicle but he refused, and the vehicle came to a rest after crashing into a fence. Ray exited the vehicle brandishing a gun, and an officer fired at Ray. Ray was pronounced dead at the hospital, and a handgun was recovered at the scene.
2021-04-04	Danny White (43)	White	Albuquerque, New Mexico	Police were called after White, who had Huntington's Disease, allegedly punched his stepfather. According to bodycam video White got up and told officers to shoot him. Officers tackled White, who fell unconscious and died. His death was ruled a homicide.
2021-04-03	Jeffrey Appelt (32)	White	Corvallis, Oregon	Corvallis police shot and killed Appelt after he threatened them with a small knife and yelled "do you want to die?"
2021-04-03	Jose Arenas (26)	Hispanic	Phoenix, Arizona	According to the Phoenix Police Department, Arenas was fatally shot by a police officer after pointing a gun at the officer.
2021-04-03	Juan Carlos Estrada (40)	Hispanic	Moreno Valley, California	Deputies responded to a home where suspect Juan Estrada was sought in connection with kidnapping and assault with a deadly weapon. While deputies were providing orders to a man who exited the home, Estrada ran from the home with his arms extended toward authorities, holding a dark-colored object which turned out to be a water bottle. Deputies fired and struck Estrada several times and was pronounced dead at the scene.
2021-04-03	Diwone Wallace (24)	Black	Alorton, Illinois	
2021-04-03	Samuel Yeager (23)	White	Douglas County, Colorado	Yeager was shot and killed by Douglas County Sheriff's deputies.
2021-04-02	Noah Green (25)	Black	Washington, D.C.	A man from Indiana rammed his car into a barricade, killing one officer. He then pulled out a knife, and was shot by police.
2021-04-02	Lauren Archibeque (38)	White	Long Beach, California	According to the Long Beach Police Department, a woman was shot and killed by police after pointing a rifle at them.
2021-04-02	Natzeryt Viertel (22)	White	Salem, Oregon	After Salem firefighters responded to reports of a suicidal man who had injured himself, Viertel threatened them with a gun. Police then arrived and Salem police officer Clinton Sealey shot and killed Viertel, who died on the scene. Viertel's mother was present at the scene when her son was shot.
2021-04-02	Jackie Cameron Capps Jr.	Unknown	Hurdle Mills, North Carolina	According to the Person County Sheriff, a man holding hostages was shot to death by a deputy.
2021-04-02	Angel Nelson (23)	Hispanic	Corona, California	Nelson was shot by investigators who were surveilling him in a parking lot.
2021-04-01	Stephen Patrick Moseley (36)	Black	Fremont, California	After two detectives from the Fremont Police Department trailed and approached a man with warrants, they released a K-9 and shot and killed the man after he displayed a firearm. The confrontation started when Moseley was leaving a Hyatt Hotel and tried to run away from undercover police officers. While he was bitten and held by the police dog, Moseley pointed a gun at officers while yelling 'kill me, kill me'. A video of the shooting has been released by police.
2021-04-01	DeShawn Tatum (25)	Black	Rock Island, Illinois	Rock Island police saw Tatum, who was "a wanted suspect..considered armed and dangerous". When officers approached Tatum he ran "while in possession of a gun", and officials say he was shot when he tried to hijack a car.
2021-04-01	James Iler (47)	White	Brighton, Illinois	A Macoupin County Sheriff's deputy shot twice and killed Iler after he charged with a knife. Iler called the police from his home, very upset. Officers were dispatched to his house and spent 50 minutes talking to Iler. They shot him when he appeared to charge at them with a knife.
2021-04-01	Steven Ross Glass (35)	White	Lakewood, Colorado	Glass was shot and killed by SWAT after firing a toy airsoft gun at police.

== See also ==
- Death in custody § United States
- Henry A. Wallace Police Crime Public Database
- List of cases of police brutality
- List of countries with annual rates and counts for killings by law enforcement officers
- List of law enforcement officers killed in the line of duty in the United States
- List of law enforcement officers convicted for an on-duty killing in the United States
- List of shootings by US immigration agents
- List of police reforms related to the George Floyd protests
- List of unarmed African Americans killed by law enforcement officers in the United States
- Lists of killings by law enforcement officers
- Police brutality in the United States
- Police misconduct § United States
- Police riot § United States
- Police use of deadly force in the United States
