= Killing of Sean Bell =

2006 killing of an unarmed man in New York

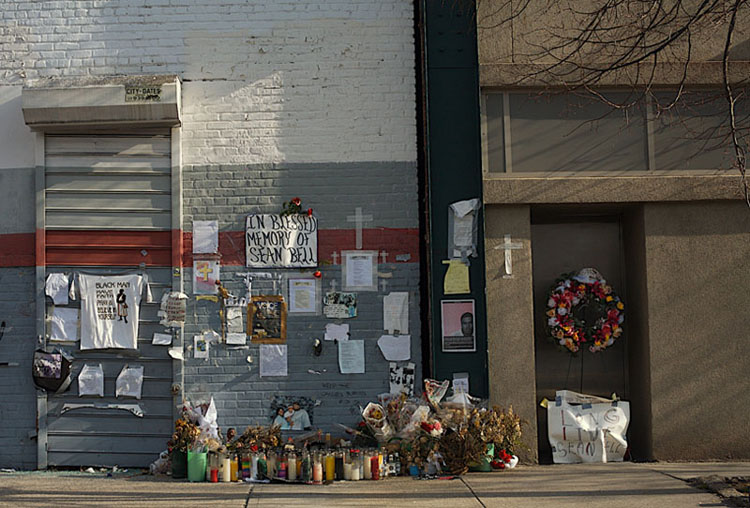
- Memorial to Sean Bell at the place of the shooting
- Date: November 25, 2006
- Location: Jamaica, Queens, New York City 40.6983°N 73.8085°W
- Deaths: 1 (Sean Bell)
- Accused: Michael Carey; Marc Cooper; Gescard Isnora; Michael Oliver
- Charges: Manslaughter, assault, reckless endangerment
- Verdict: All found not guilty
- Litigation: $3.25 million lawsuit filed by Sean Bell's family

Sean Bell, an African American, was shot and killed by undercover New York City Police Department (NYPD) officers in the borough of Queens on November 25, 2006. Bell and two of his friends were shot when both plainclothes and undercover NYPD officers fired a total of 50 rounds. Bell's friends, Trent Benefield and Joseph Guzman, were severely wounded. The incident sparked fierce criticism of the New York City Police Department from members of the public and drew comparisons to the 1999 killing of Amadou Diallo. Three of the five detectives involved in the shooting went to trial on charges of first- and second-degree manslaughter, first- and second-degree assault, and second-degree reckless endangerment; they were found not guilty.

== Background ==
Born on May 18, 1983, Bell was 23 years old at the time of his death. He was a nephew of college basketball coach Frank Haith. Bell was a pitcher on the baseball team for John Adams High School in Ozone Park, and also studied acting in Flushing, Queens and worked odd jobs after the birth of his daughter, Jada, on December 16, 2002. His fiancée, Nicole Paultre, told Larry King that Bell was studying to be an electrician.

== Shooting incident ==
On the night of his death, Bell was hosting a bachelor party at Club Kalua, a strip club that was being investigated by undercover police over accusations that the owners fostered prostitution. The New York Post reported that Joseph Guzman had an argument with a man outside the bar, and threatened to get a gun. One of Bell's friends reportedly said, "Yo, get my gun," as they left the club. Thinking a shooting was about to take place, a plainclothes officer named Gescard Isnora followed Bell and his companions. He alerted his backup team, who confronted Bell and his companions outside. According to Isnora, he "held out his badge, identified himself as a police officer, and ordered the driver to stop". Instead, Bell accelerated the car, striking Isnora, and then collided with an unmarked police minivan. Isnora said he saw Guzman reach for a gun. He yelled a warning to the other policemen, and they opened fire on the car to prevent the possible shooting by Guzman. Five policemen joined in, firing about 50 bullets into Bell's car.

Witness accounts of the event conflict with the account provided by police. According to Joseph Guzman, the plainclothes detectives never identified themselves as they approached with their weapons drawn. According to the New York Daily News, witnesses claimed the officers failed to warn Bell before opening fire, beginning to shoot as soon as they left their cars. A toxicology report showed that Bell was legally intoxicated at the time he was shot. An attorney for Bell's family replied, "No matter what his blood-alcohol level was, he's a victim."

Isnora, the officer who initiated the shooting, claimed later that he saw a fourth man in the car who fled the scene, possibly with the alleged weapon. It was speculated that one of Bell's friends, Jean Nelson, was the fourth man. Nelson admitted that he was present but denied being in the car or having a weapon. Critics suggest that Isnora fabricated the alleged presence of a fourth man to justify the shooting and to avoid being convicted by a jury. New York Daily News columnist Juan Gonzalez reported that in the hours immediately after the shooting, there was no mention of a fourth man in police calls, and no search was launched for the alleged armed man. This contradicts claims that the police searched the neighborhood for a missing man. According to The New York Times, a preliminary police report said:

... there was no meaningful discussion of a fourth man, a mysterious figure who some in the Police Department have suggested may have been present along with the three men who were shot. None of the witnesses whose accounts are in the report speaks of someone who may have fled — perhaps possessing a gun — and there are no indications that the police at the time were seeking anyone who may have left the scene.

According to Michael Palladino, head of the police detectives union, a man working as a janitor in a nearby building told the detectives that he had seen a black man fleeing the scene, and that the man had fired at least once at the police. The janitor claimed he had then heard a detective shouting "police, police". However, ballistic evidence showed no evidence of any weapon having been fired except those of the officers.

In an interview on Larry King Live, Al Sharpton, accompanied by Paultre, stated that according to his conversations with eyewitnesses, none of the three men mentioned a gun while leaving the club. Sharpton also said that it would have been impossible for anyone in the car to have heard the police; he said they were likely in fear that they were being car-jacked. The NYPD Detectives union and others complained that the payments brought into question the witnesses' credibility. Sharpton replied, "How can [the Detectives Endowment Association] support the detectives and I can't support the victims?"

Five of the seven officers took part in the shooting. Detective Paul Headley fired one shot. Officer Michael Carey fired three times. Officer Marc Cooper shot four times, and Officer Gescard Isnora eleven. Veteran officer Michael Oliver emptied two full magazines, firing 31 times with a 9mm handgun, pausing to reload at least once.

An autopsy showed that Bell had been struck four times in the neck and torso. Guzman was shot 19 times, and Benefield, who was in the back seat of the vehicle, was hit three times. Guzman and Benefield were taken to Mary Immaculate Hospital. Guzman was listed in critical condition, and Benefield was in stable condition; both men survived the shooting. Benefield was released from the hospital on December 5, 2006, while Guzman was released on January 25, 2007. Surveillance cameras at the Port Authority's Jamaica AirTrain station a half block away from the shooting site recorded one of the bullets shattering the station's glass window, narrowly missing a bystander and two Port Authority patrolmen standing on the elevated platform.

== Response to the shooting ==
New York City mayor Michael Bloomberg said, "it sounds to me like excessive force was used," and called the shooting "inexplicable" and "unacceptable". Ex-New York State governor George E. Pataki also stated that he thought the shooting was excessive. NYC police commissioner Raymond Kelly put the five officers involved on paid administrative leave and stripped them of their weapons, a move the New York Times called "forceful". He told the Times that the officers were stripped of their guns because "there were, and are, too many unanswered questions". Both Bloomberg and Kelly also noted that the shooting was possibly in violation of department guidelines prohibiting shooting at a moving vehicle, even if the vehicle is being used as a weapon. The Public Advocate extended condolences to Bell's former fiancée and family following the killing.

Thousands of people took to the streets to protest against the amount of force used the weekend following Bell's death, with protests continuing into the following week.

Some noted the similarity between this incident and past shootings of unarmed people, such as Amadou Diallo and Ousmane Zongo. The family designated Al Sharpton as their advisor.

On December 7, 2006, Nicole Paultre legally changed her name to Nicole Paultre Bell to "honor the memory" of Bell.

According to Nicole Paultre's attorney, a posthumous wedding was impossible since no marriage license had yet been signed.

On March 5, 2007, it was announced that a Rikers Island inmate offered to pay an undercover police officer posing as a hitman to behead New York City police commissioner Raymond Kelly and bomb police headquarters in retaliation for the incident.

On March 25, 2007, New York Daily News reported that an unnamed Queens drug dealer, after being arrested, alleged that Bell had shot him the previous year on July 13, 2006, over a drug turf dispute. Police sources called the drug dealer's account credible but could not rule out the possibility that he falsely identified Bell to garner favor with authorities. The attorney representing the Bell family, Nicole Paultre, and the two other occupants of the vehicle who were wounded during the shooting denounced this development, saying, "We expected them to throw dirt at us, and they are throwing dirt at us." NYPD Internal Affairs Bureau detectives said the dealer's tale had no direct bearing on the police shooting of Bell, though Paultre Bell's attorney noted that it could help the defense by portraying Bell as possibly armed and dangerous.

== Investigation and case ==
=== Criminal indictment ===
At that time, some activists called for a special prosecutor in the case, but New York Governor Eliot Spitzer said he did not see the need for it. Attorney General Andrew Cuomo promised to keep a watch on the criminal proceedings. The Queens district attorney's office interviewed over 100 witnesses and presented more than 500 exhibits to a grand jury. An issue considered by the grand jury was the New York State Penal Code's description of circumstances under which a police officer can use deadly force: "The use of deadly physical force is necessary to defend the police officer or peace officer or another person from what the officer reasonably believes to be the use or imminent use of deadly physical force."

On March 16, 2007, three of the five police officers involved in the shooting were indicted by a grand jury. Officer Gescard Isnora, who fired the first shot, and Officer Michael Oliver, who fired 31 of the 50 shots, were charged with first- and second-degree manslaughter, second-degree reckless endangerment and first- and second-degree assault. Detective Marc Cooper was charged with two counts of reckless endangerment. All three detectives pleaded not guilty at the arraignment hearing on March 19, 2007. Detectives Isnora and Oliver were released on bail, and Detective Cooper was released on his own recognizance. Oliver and Isnora initially faced up to 25 years in prison for the charges.

The Appellate Division of the Supreme Court, Second Department, denied a motion by the detectives' attorneys to move the trial to a venue outside of Queens. Following the adverse ruling, the detectives waived a jury trial and instead submitted to a bench trial.

Then-District Attorney Richard Brown faced some criticism from activists who believe he did not question the police officers involved quickly enough.

=== Trial and acquittal on all charges ===
On April 25, 2008, all three of the police officers indicted were acquitted on all counts. The defendants opted to have Justice Arthur J. Cooperman make a ruling rather than a jury. The ruling was handed down in a State Supreme Court in Queens. (In New York State, Supreme Court is the trial-level court of unlimited original jurisdiction.)

A key defense forensic witness was Alexander Jason, a crime scene analyst and ballistics expert who disproved several of the prosecution's main points relating to the physical evidence. Among them was the timing of the incident. After performing tests with an NYPD pistol, Jason demonstrated that the 31 shots fired by one detective (Oliver) could have been done in about 12 seconds – not several minutes. Using high speed video during ballistic testing, Jason demonstrated that bullets fired through a car window would project glass both inside and outside the car and that this could be interpreted as shots coming from inside. Another of Jason's key points (mentioned in Judge Cooperman's written verdict) was that the person in the back seat of Bell's car (Benefield) was not shot while he was running away as he claimed, but while inside the car. Jason used computer generated 3D models to display some of his findings.

In his ruling, Justice Cooperman stated that testimony by Guzman and Benefield did not make sense. He also cited the fact that they had a pending $50,000,000 lawsuit against the city. After the ruling was made, the family, led by Sharpton and several others, went to Bell's graveside in Port Washington, Long Island for a memorial service.

Although the officers were acquitted, they and their commanding officer were either fired or forced to resign on March 24, 2012.

== After acquittal ==
=== "Slowdown" protest ===
On May 7, 2008, Al Sharpton led a series of protests in New York City. Hundreds of Black people took to the streets in Manhattan and Brooklyn as part of the citywide "slowdown" effort led by Sharpton and his National Action Network. The crowd made its way to the streets, stopping the flow of traffic in many vital areas of the city. This led to police action and the arrest of over 200 people, including Sharpton himself. Sharpton was arrested without incident at the base of the Brooklyn Bridge. Bell's parents, his former fiancée, Nicole Paultre Bell, and the two shooting victims who survived, Trent Benefield and Joseph Guzman, were also arrested.

=== Civil case ===
On May 18, 2010, U.S. District Judge Sterling Johnson, Jr. of the United States District Court for the Eastern District of New York lifted a stay on the civil lawsuit brought by Nicole Paultre Bell against the City of New York. On July 27, 2010 a settlement was reached. New York City agreed to pay Sean Bell's family $3.25 million. Joseph Guzman, 34, who uses a cane and a leg brace and has four bullets lodged in his body was to receive $3 million, and Trent Benefield, 26, was to receive $900,000. The total amount of the settlement was $7.15 million. Paultre Bell said, "I believe the settlement is fair, but the most important thing is that our fight, my fight, doesn't end here. No amount of money can provide closure." New York City Corporation Counsel stated, "The city regrets the loss of life in this tragic case, and we share our deepest condolences with the Bell family." The head of the New York City Detectives Endowment Association said he thought the settlement was "a joke". "The detectives were exonerated ... and now the taxpayer is on the hook for $7 million, and the attorneys are in line to get $2 million, without suffering a scratch." Guzman said the settlement did not change the underlying reality that the lives of Black and Hispanic men were not worth much in New York and that the incident was bound to be repeated.

=== NYPD edits to Wikipedia article ===
On March 13, 2015, Capital New York and other news organizations reported that 50 of the 15,000 IP addresses belonging to the NYPD were associated with edits, dating back to 2006, to English Wikipedia articles, including the article on the killing of Sean Bell. These IP addresses geolocate to NYPD headquarters at 1 Police Plaza. Detective Cheryl Crispin, a NYPD spokeswoman, said that "the matter is under internal review."

== Tributes ==
The Nicole Paultre Bell "When It's Real, It's Forever" non-profit organization was started in memory of Bell. Rappers David Banner, Nicki Minaj, Prodigy, Immortal Technique and the Jamaica, Queens-based rap group G-Unit, The Game and Chamillionaire have each referenced the case in their songs. G-Unit dedicated the opening track of their album T.O.S: Terminate on Sight to Bell and also paid tribute to him in the thank-you section of the liner notes. Nicki Minaj dedicated part of her verse New York Minute to Bell, with the line "There's gotta be a heaven 'cause Sean Bell will never get to make it to his wedding." Bell is one of the names mentioned in "Hell You Talmbout", a 2015 protest song by Janelle Monáe and the Wondaland artist collective. Chamillionaire referenced the case on the Mixtape Messiah 2 disc at the end of the song "Ridin' Overseas" (featuring Akon) where he says, "Rest in peace to Sean Bell, Chamillitary man". The Game dedicated the controversial song "911 is a Joke" to Bell. The Game dedicated the song "My Life" to Bell as well. Pharoahe Monch's cover of the Public Enemy song "Welcome to the Terrordome" includes a reference to Bell as well as to Amadou Diallo and Timothy Stansbury in the introduction.

Swizz Beatz, Cassidy, Maino, Styles P, Talib Kweli, Red Cafe & Drag-On recorded a song entitled "Stand Up (The Sean Bell Tribute Song)" in which they refer to the shooting.

Rapper JAY Z set up a trust fund for Bell's children.

=== Sean Bell Way ===
The New York City Council voted in December 2009 to designate Liverpool Street from 94th to 101st Avenues in Queens as "Sean Bell Way" in his memory. The street was formally rededicated with a ceremony on May 18, 2010.

== See also ==
- List of unarmed African Americans killed by law enforcement officers in the United States
- Contagious shooting
- Jean-Charles de Menezes
- Johnny Gammage
- Ousmane Zongo
- Amadou Diallo
- Nightlife legislation of the United States
- List of killings by law enforcement officers in the United States
