= Olango =

Olango may refer to:

- Olango Island Group, group of islands in the Philippines
- Alfred Olango (1978–2016), Ugandan refugee fatally shot by police in El Cajon, California, U.S.

== See also ==
- Olingo, a small South American mammal
