= Charles Strum =

American journalist (1948–2021)

- Born: Charles Laurence Strum; January 28, 1948; Manhattan, New York, U.S.
- Died: April 27, 2021 (aged 73); Middlebury, Vermont, U.S.
- Education: Dickinson College
- Occupations: Journalist; Writer
- Spouse: Rebecca Ware (m. 1970)
- Children: 4

Charles Laurence Strum (January 28, 1948 – April 27, 2021) was an American journalist and author. He worked as a senior editor at The New York Times from 1979 until his retirement in 2014.

== Early life ==
Strum was born in Manhattan on January 28, 1948. His father, Emmanuel, worked as a lawyer; his mother, Dorothy (Doloboff), was a housewife. Strum attended Dickinson College, obtaining a bachelor's degree in history in 1970. He started his career in journalism with the Hudson Dispatch, working there as a reporter for a year.

== Career ==
Strum was employed by The Record as a reporter and editor until 1976. He went on to work as an assistant news editor at Newsday for three years. He subsequently joined The New York Times in 1979.

Strum first oversaw the Public Lives column and was a copy editor. Other roles he occupied on the Metro desk included the New Jersey bureau chief; he also contributed to the editing work on several other news desks, including the Foreign desk. It was in that capacity that he edited coverage of South Africa's first free elections. He worked with five of his colleagues – Robert D. McFadden, Ralph Blumenthal, E. R. Shipp, M. A. Farber, and Craig Wolff – on Outrage: The Story Behind the Tawana Brawley Hoax, published in 1990 covering the Tawana Brawley rape allegations from three years earlier. He served as the book's internal editor.

Strum was appointed Obituaries editor of the paper in 2001. He spoke to Robert Siegel on NPR about the role two years later, as well as some of the notable mistakes of late in the section. He stated that he would seldom employ the terms "first" or "last" in an obituary, in order to eschew issues with contradictory testimony. He was named as the associate managing editor of the Times in 2006. He was critical of Byron Calame's tenure as public editor of the Times from 2005 to 2007, describing him as "dreadful" and opining how he was "rearranging the placemats on the Titanic".

Strum delivered a talk at Middlebury College in October 2008 titled "When the Media Call". He advised faculty and staff on how to interact with the press. He gave another talk five years later at Millersville University of Pennsylvania to students interested in going into journalism.

Strum contributed to a project covering a cluster of men with intellectual disabilities who labored in servitude for three decades in Iowa, that won the Katherine Schneider Journalism Award for Excellence in Reporting on Disability in 2014. He retired from The New York Times that same year. He nonetheless remained active as an editor, working in that capacity for three years at The Marshall Project. He also participated in the Times' Student Journalism Institute in May 2015.

== Personal life ==
Strum married Rebecca Ware in 1970. Together, they had two children: Alec and Kate. He also had twin daughters, Sara and Mary Lee Kenney, with Nancy Kenney, a fellow Times staff editor. He identified as a moderate Democrat "who does not know which side of the fence he is on".

Strum resided in Weybridge, Vermont, during his later years. He died on April 27, 2021, at a nursing home in Middlebury, Vermont. He was 73, and suffered from glioblastoma prior to his death.
