= Killing of Andrew Brown Jr. =

Police shooting in Elizabeth City, North Carolina

- Part of 2020–2021 United States racial unrest
- Location of the incident in Elizabeth City.
- Date: April 21, 2021
- Time: 8:30 a.m. EDT
- Location: Elizabeth City, North Carolina, United States
- Type: Shooting
- Deaths: Andrew Brown Jr.
- Shooting under investigation

On April 21, 2021, Andrew Brown Jr., a 42-year-old black American, was killed by a gunshot to the back of the head by the Sheriff Department in Elizabeth City, North Carolina, United States. The shooting occurred while deputies were serving drug-related search and arrest warrants at the Brown residence. The arrest warrant, issued on April 20, was for possession with intent to sell "approximately three grams of cocaine." Seven officers were placed on leave as a result of the shooting.

The total amount of footage of the incident is around 2 hours. After being allowed to watch 20 seconds of body camera footage, a Brown family lawyer said that shots were first heard while Brown's car was sitting stationary, in his driveway, and that both of his hands were on the steering wheel. The District Attorney disagreed, saying shots were heard only after Brown put the vehicle in motion, attempted to flee, and caused the car to "make contact" with the arresting officers (none of the deputies sustained injuries). After being allowed to watch around 18 minutes of footage, a second Brown family lawyer said that the videos did not show Brown initiating contact between his car and the deputies. The full body camera videos of the shooting are currently being blocked by a judge's order from being publicly released.

On May 18, 2021, District Attorney Andrew Womble announced that the deputies who shot Brown were justified in using deadly force and would not be charged criminally. "The facts of this case", said Womble, "clearly illustrate the officers who used deadly force on Andrew Brown Jr. did so reasonably and only when a violent felon used a deadly weapon to place their lives in danger". On May 5, 2021, prior to Womble's announcement attorneys for the Brown family had requested that Womble recuse himself, as he worked with Sheriff Wooten and his deputies and his office physically resided in the Sheriff's department. They stated, "The conflict is well-defined."

== Incident ==
=== Police statement ===
Pasquotank County Sheriff Tommy Wooten II said that "deputies from his department including a tactical team were attempting to perform search and arrest warrants on illegal distribution of cocaine, methamphetamine, crack cocaine and heroin when Brown was shot". Wooten also said that the deputies were not injured in the incident.

=== Cause of death ===
Brown's official death certificate states that Brown was killed by a gunshot to the head. The death certificate, issued by a local medical examiner, listed Brown's death as a homicide.

Pathologist Brent Hall conducted a private autopsy at the behest of Brown's family; Hall stated that Brown had been shot five times: one shot in the back of the head, piercing his brain, and four shots to his right arm.

=== Statements by Brown family lawyers ===
On April 26, Brown's family and their lawyer, Chantel Cherry-Lassiter, were allowed by Pasquotank County to watch a short video of the shooting from one deputy's body camera. She said the 20-second clip showed the deputies shooting at Brown as he sat in his vehicle with his hands on the steering wheel. She said he then drove away, while the deputies continued shooting at him, before and after he crashed the vehicle into a nearby tree. She called his killing an "execution". She said the family was told that no drugs or weapons had been found in Brown's car or on his property.

On May 11, after Brown's family and their lawyer, Chance Lynch, watched around 18 minutes of the two hours of video relating to the incident and commented on what they saw. Lynch said that they did not see Brown initiating "contact" between his car and the deputy sheriffs, nor did they see Brown driving towards the deputy sheriffs: "While there was a group of law enforcement that were in front of him, he went the opposite direction". Lynch also said that the deputy sheriffs might have reached out and touched the car.

=== Statement by prosecutor ===
On April 28, District Attorney Andrew Womble stated before a judge that Brown reversed his car, and it "make[s] contact with law enforcement officers", before driving his car forward and it "makes contact with law enforcement. It is then and only then that you hear shots". Womble said police "shouted commands and tried to open the car before any shots were fired," and called the family lawyer's description of events "patently false".

=== Recusal requested ===
On May 5, 2021 Brown family attorneys requested that District Attorney Womble recuse himself. They stated that both the deputies involved, as well as Sheriff Wooten had worked directly with Womble, on a daily basis, for a number of years, in prosecuting cases. They noted that Womble's office physically resides in the Pasquotank County Sheriff's department and stated "The conflict is well-defined."

=== Status of bodycam videos ===
On April 28, Judge Jeffery Foster issued an order to block the public release of body camera videos to the public for at least 30 days, thus rejecting requests by media outlets and the Pasquotank County sheriff for the publication of the videos, saying he did not want to affect the open investigation into Brown's death. North Carolina law states that body camera video is not a public record, and may only be released by a court order. Simultaneously, Foster ordered that Brown's family be allowed to watch redacted versions of five body camera videos and one dashboard video, within ten days. On May 18, 2021, about one minute of the bodycam video footage was released by District Attorney Andrew Womble.

== Investigation and Settlement ==
Seven sheriff's deputies were placed on administrative leave as a result of the shooting. Within a week of the killing, two other deputies resigned, and one other deputy retired; this was not related to the killing, stated a member of the Pasquotank County Sheriff's Office.

On April 29, the names of the seven deputies were released. Four of the deputies involved in the incident were cleared to return to their duties because they did not fire their guns. The three deputies who fired shots remain on administrative leave, pending results of the internal investigation and investigation by the State Bureau of Investigation. The three officers placed on administrative leave were Daniel Meads, Robert Morgan, and Aaron Lewellyn.

=== FBI investigation ===
The FBI announced on April 27 that it would be launching a civil rights probe into Brown's death. An agency spokesman stated, "Agents will work closely with the U.S. Attorney's Office for the Eastern District of North Carolina and the Civil Rights Division at the Department of Justice to determine whether federal laws were violated."

=== Lawsuit and settlement ===
In July 2021, Brown's family filed a $30 million federal lawsuit against the North Carolina sheriff's department. In addition to seeking $30 million in damages, the lawsuit sought release of audio files and body cam footage of the shooting that hadn't been made public. In June 2022, Brown's family was awarded a $3 million settlement from the North Carolina police department, approved by the Pasquotank County Board of Commissioners. According to a statement from North Carolina's sheriff's office, the settlement included $2 million from the county's insurance policy and a special $1 million appropriation.

== Reactions ==
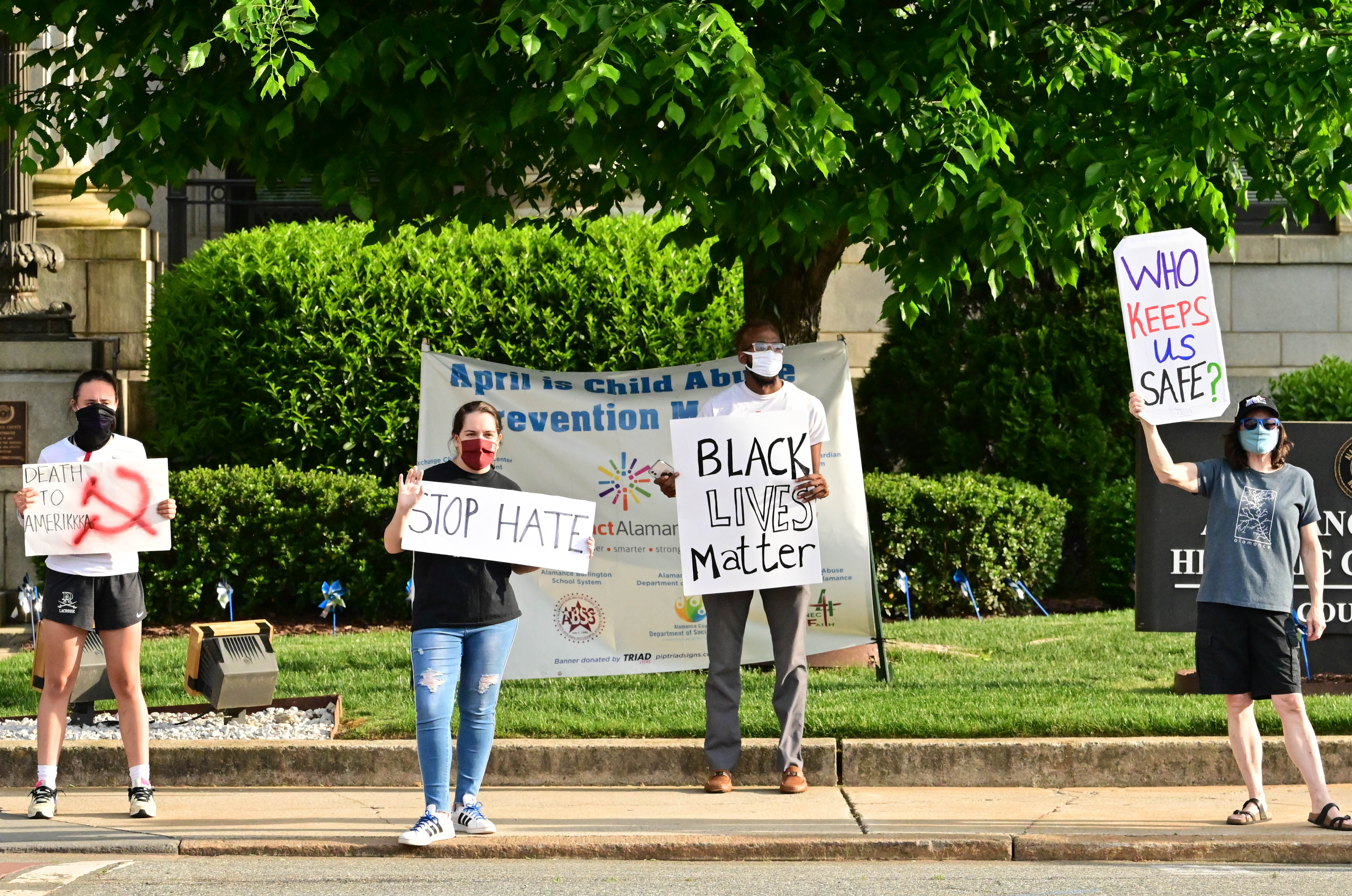
Protesters in Graham, North Carolina, April 28, 2021

=== Protests ===
On the sixth day of marches in the city, protesters stopped traffic on the bridge over the Pasquotank River between Elizabeth City and Camden County for an hour. Elizabeth City Mayor Bettie Parker declared a state of emergency before the full release of the body cam footage that led up to the shooting.

On the thirty fourth consecutive day of marches in Elizabeth City, a woman was arrested after striking protesters with her car on Ehringhaus Street. After initially being allowed to enter the street by Elizabeth City Police Department, the woman drove into the group, striking three people, before driving away. She was later apprehended by the police, arrested, and charged with two felony counts of assault with a deadly weapon with intent to kill and one count each of careless and reckless driving and unsafe movement.

People protested an emergency meeting of the Elizabeth City council with signs reading "Black Lives Matter" and "Stop Killing Unarmed Black Men".

=== Public officials ===
White House Press Secretary Jen Psaki stated, "Obviously, the loss of life is a tragedy and obviously we're thinking of the family members and the community" and that President Biden was aware of the situation.

North Carolina Governor Roy Cooper, as well as the family of Brown, immediately called for the bodycam footage to be released. Cooper wrote, "Initial reports of the shooting in Elizabeth City and death of Andrew Brown, Jr. this week are tragic and extremely concerning. The body camera footage should be made public as quickly as possible and the SBI should investigate thoroughly to ensure accountability." Governor Cooper and Attorney General Josh Stein would later travel to Elizabeth City to meet with the Pasquotank NAACP, to address safety concerns in light of local protesters receiving threats.

== See also ==
- List of unarmed African Americans killed by law enforcement officers in the United States
- List of killings by law enforcement officers in the United States, April 2021
