= Contagious shooting =

Concept in sociology

A contagious shooting, also known as sympathetic fire, is a sociological phenomenon observed in police personnel, in which one person firing on a target can induce others to begin shooting without knowing why they are firing. The term may have been coined, but certainly rose to prominence in public discourse in the aftermath of the killing of Amadou Diallo by the NYPD in 1999. DeCarlo, Dlugolenski, and Myers (2024) conducted a randomized trial with 169 officers across four states and 11 agencies. Officers were randomly assigned to test or control conditions. Each officer experienced the exact same scenario. In test conditions, two peer (role player) officers fired their weapons. In the control condition they withheld their fire. The odds of officers firing in the presence of peer fire was 11.57 times greater, and they fired 72% more rounds on average than the control condition. The large effect size and causal design demonstrated that behavioral interdependence is a key concern in multi-officer-involved shootings

== Examples ==
- 2026: In Minneapolis, Minnesota, three law enforcement experts consulted by CNN in the killing of Alex Pretti suggested the shooting pattern could be indicative of contagious fire.
- 2013: In California, officers involved in the search for Christopher Dorner mistakenly fired at least 100 rounds at a truck occupied by three people, none of whom had any connection to the suspect. Each of the two women injured received $2.1 million in a settlement with the city of Los Angeles.
- 2012: NYPD officers responded to a report of shots fired with one victim killed in front of the Empire State Building. Officers fired sixteen rounds, wounding 9 bystanders and killing the shooter.
- 2011: On Memorial Day in Miami Beach, several police officers fired until their magazines were empty on a stopped car after the driver smashed into other cars, killing the driver and injuring seven bystanders.
- 2010: A bystander was injured in Harlem when a man "open[ed] fire on responding officers, who fired 46 times in response". "In the Harlem episode, unlike the Bell and Diallo cases, a gun was shot before any officers fired, according to the police account. So, Professor O'Donnell said, in the Harlem case, 'there really is a shot,' and not just the threat of gunfire."
- 2009: A man threatening officers with a rifle was shot 59 times in what was ruled a "suicide-by-cop" in Chattanooga, Tennessee.
- 2006: Five officers fired 50 shots at Sean Bell in Queens, New York, including 31 by one detective—who reloaded his weapon during the incident.
- 2006: Three officers fired 26 shots at a pit bull that had bitten a chunk out of an officer's leg in the Bronx, New York, in July.
- 2006: Police in Lakeland, Florida, fired 110 rounds at a suspect, Angilo Freeland, who had killed an officer earlier, hitting him 68 times. Polk County Sheriff Grady Judd told the Orlando Sentinel, "That's all the bullets we had".
- 2005: Eight officers fired 43 shots at Brian Allen, an armed man in Queens, New York, killing him.
- 2005: June, six Los Angeles County, California sheriff's deputies fired more than 50 shots into the car in which drunken driving suspect Carl Williams was driving after his car rammed a police vehicle following a chase. One deputy had to reload his weapon during the incident.
- 2004: "When 44-year-old drug suspect Winston Hayes' SUV lurched forward, he hit a police car, deputies unloaded their weapons, firing 120 shots. Four bullets ended up hitting Hayes, who survived, one hit a deputy sheriff, 11 hit patrol cars, and 11 hit five homes in the neighborhood (one of them ended up tearing a hole in a homeowner's hat)." —ABC News.
- 1999: Four officers fired 41 shots at Amadou Diallo, an unarmed man in the Bronx, New York, on February 4, 1999.
- 1998: New Jersey State Police fired 11 shots at Daniel Reyes and three other basketball players in their car in April.
- 1970: May 4. Kent State shootings: "It appeared to go on, as a solid volley, for perhaps a full minute or a little longer". The question of why the shots were fired remains widely debated.
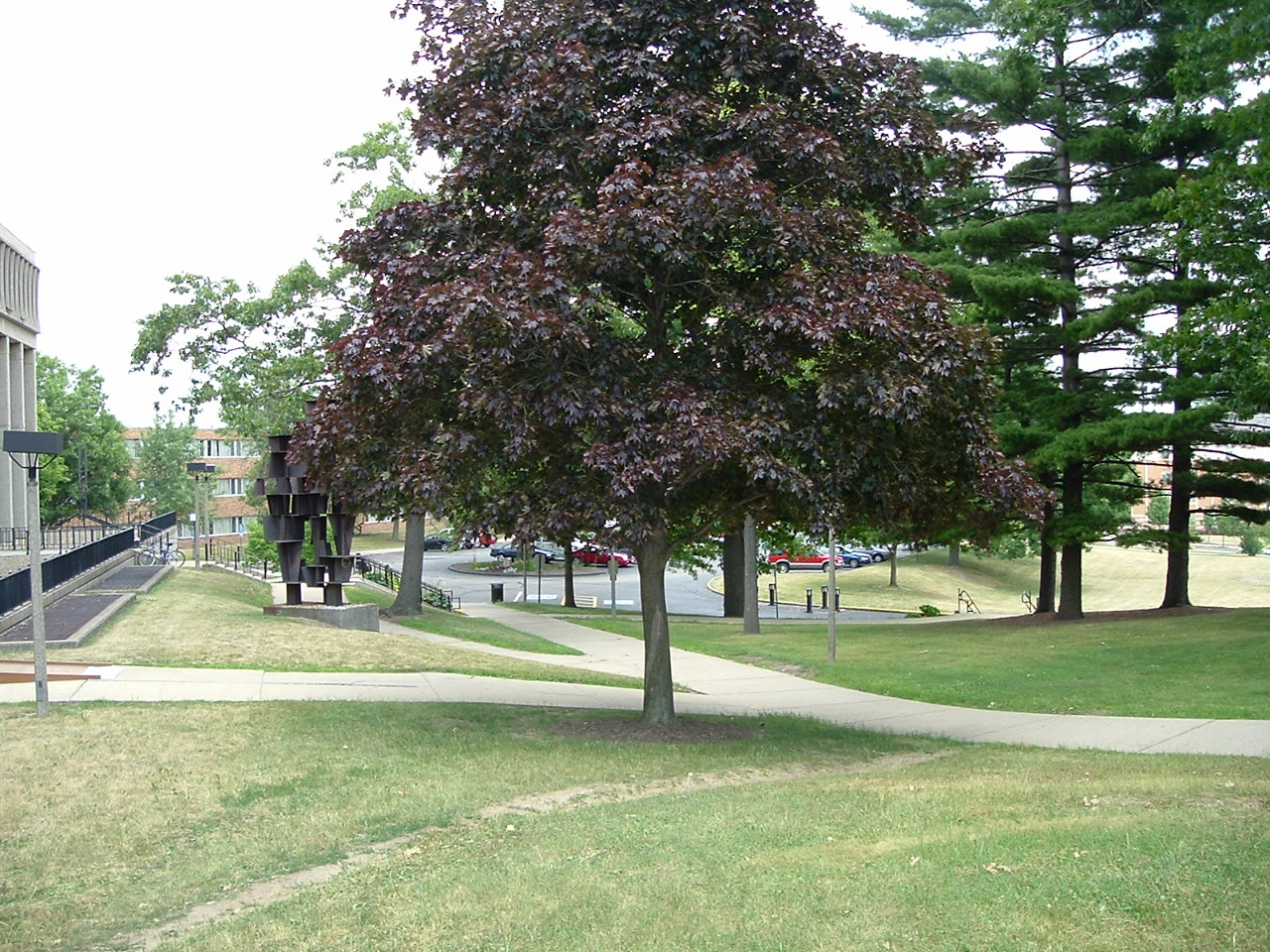
  Photo taken from the perspective of where the Ohio National Guard soldiers stood when they opened fire on the students
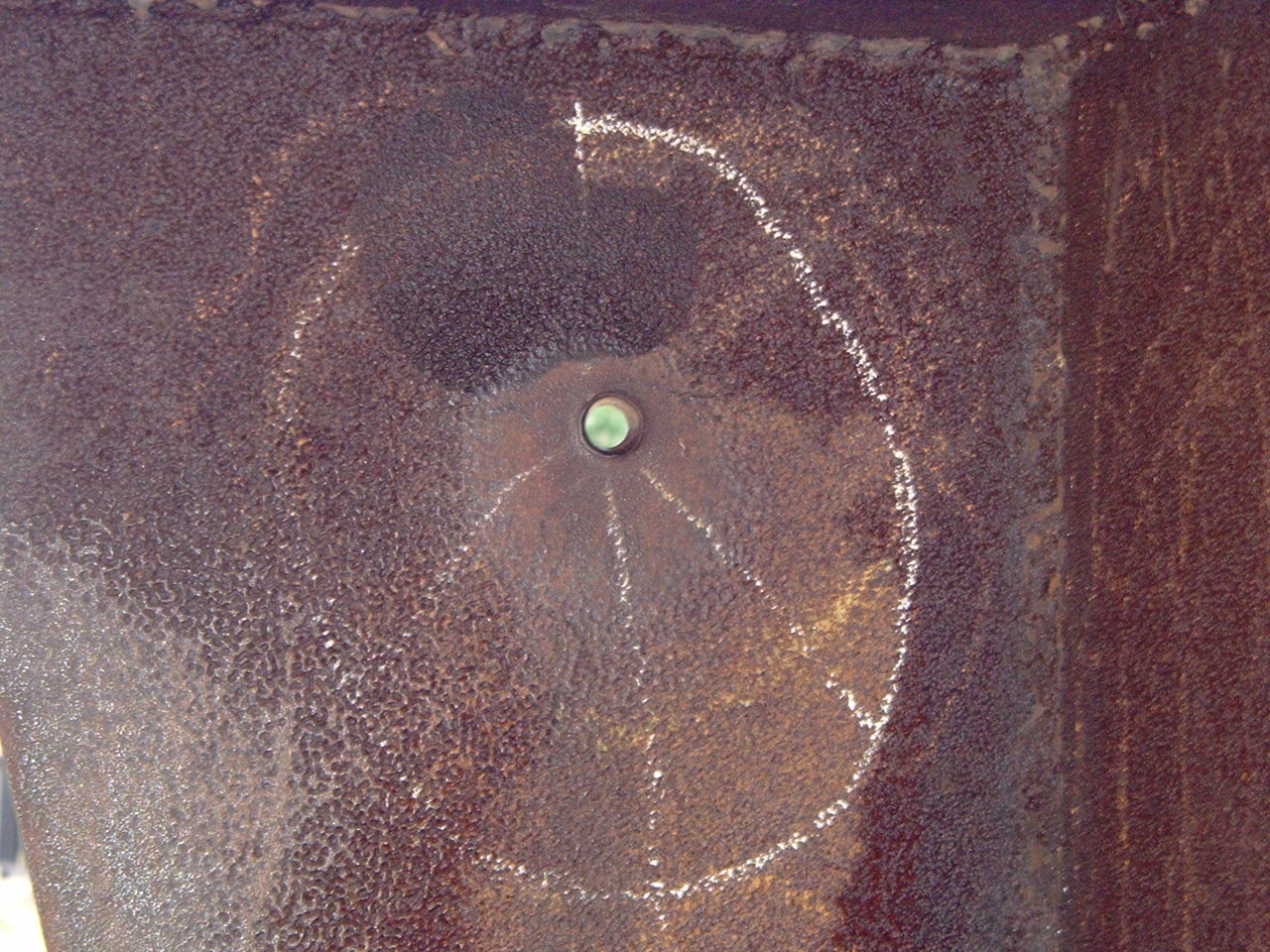
  Bullet hole in Solar Totem #1 sculpture by Don Drumm caused by a .30 caliber round fired by the Ohio National Guard at Kent State on May 4, 1970

== Usage ==
- The New York Times; August 12, 2010; Defined as "officers firing because others are doing so… The simplest culturally accepted definition … is that 'cops shoot because other cops shoot.'"
- United Press International; November 27, 2006; Police experts had suggested "contagious shooting" may have played a role in a deadly New York incident when five officers fired 50 rounds at a man.
- The Baltimore Sun; May 24, 2006; "If one fire,, the rest fire. It is called contagious shooting," Mamet said. "People start shooting; they don't even know why."
- The New York Times; March 26, 1999; "Some law enforcement officials said that it was possible that only one or two of the officers perceived a danger, and that the others opened fire simply because their comrades had begun firing—a phenomenon known in law enforcement circles as contagious shooting."
- New York Daily News; March 10, 1999; "A lawyer for one of four cops who shot Amadou Diallo hinted yesterday that a phenomenon known as "contagious shooting"—in which a cop's shot sparks a volley from other officers—may have caused his client to fire 16 shots... According to the NYPD patrol guide, a contagious shooting occurs when "a shot fired by one officer sets off a chain reaction of shooting by other personnel … Thomas Reppetto, head of the Citizens Crime Commission, said the term contagious shooting was used during 1960s riots when a cop would fire at what he thought was a sniper and other officers would follow."

== More views ==
Besides the above examples, the phenomenon has been observed in other contexts. A former CIA employee and FBI firearms instructor observed it in training. "Consistently, in every class, officers would shoot at their target upon hearing others shoot, even when their particular target board did not contain the called target." He suggests that one reason it occurs is because of muscle memory: "[T]he targets turn, or the whistle blows, and all the officers shoot together until a cease-fire signal is given."

Law professor Eugene O'Donnell was once quoted describing the notion as "debatable" although in the same interview he agreed with its existence, saying that in classic cases involving contagious shooting, "a gun was shot before any officers fired", and thus "the officers involved began shooting because of fear or because of the sound of a colleague firing".

== See also ==
- Memetics
