= The Seven Last Words of the Unarmed =

2016 choral work by American composer, Joel Thompson

Seven Last Words of the Unarmed is a choral composition by Atlanta-based composer Joel Thompson.

The piece contains seven movements, each of which quotes the last words of an unarmed Black man before he was killed. Thompson has said that in composing the piece, he "used the liturgical format in Haydn's The Seven Last Words of Christ in an effort to humanize these men and to reckon with my identity as a black man in this country in relation to this specific scourge of police brutality." He was also inspired by the illustrations of Iranian-American artist Shirin Barghi.

The work was premiered in November 2015 by the University of Michigan Men's Glee Club under the direction of Eugene Rogers. Rogers said,

"...I hesitated before taking it to my glee club; I did not want them to think I was pushing an agenda. At the same time, repertoire that deals with issues of social justice is important to me, a part of my philosophy of teaching. It engages our audience, builds a strong sense of community amongst our singers, and can foster musical ubuntu. As Nelson Mandela defined the philosophy, ubuntu holds that our personal humanity is dependent on the humanity of others. Providing a safe place for students to express and process issues that affect us all can be very rewarding and act as another vehicle for bringing change to our world. With all of that in mind, I decided to introduce the piece to the chorus. Initially, some members felt performing it would be overly political. We talked about their concerns, and some wrote essays about them. Together we found resonance in the central theme of loss, and that enabled us to get through the journey. Some of our audience expressed similar misgivings, but most of the response was extremely positive."

The piece has also been performed by the Tallahassee Symphony Orchestra (with The Village Square, the Florida A&M Concert Choir, the Morehouse College Glee Club), the Chicago Sinfonietta, the Boston Children's Chorus, and the San Francisco Gay Men's Chorus. It found renewed interest in 2020 after the murder of George Floyd and the subsequent protests and outbreak of police violence.

== Movements ==
1. “Why do you have your guns out?” – Kenneth Chamberlain, 68
2. “What are you following me for?” – Trayvon Martin, 17
3. “Mom, I'm going to college.” – Amadou Diallo, 23
4. “I don't have a gun. Stop shooting.” – Michael Brown, 18
5. “You shot me! You shot me!” – Oscar Grant, 22
6. “It's not real.” – John Crawford, 22
7. “I can't breathe.” – Eric Garner, 43
