= Killing of Ma'Khia Bryant =

Police shooting in Columbus, Ohio, US

- Ma'Khia Bryant lunging at Tionna Bonner with a knife just before being shot, as shown by Officer Nicholas Reardon's body camera
- Date: April 20, 2021; 5 years ago
- Time: 4:45 p.m. EDT (UTC−4)
- Location: Columbus, Ohio, United States; 39.9157114°N 82.8396677°W
- Type: shooting
- Participants: CPD officer Nicholas Reardon
- Deaths: Ma'Khia Bryant, aged 16
- Injuries: Shai-Onta Lana Craig-Watkins (injured by Bryant)
- Charges: None

On April 20, 2021, Ma'Khia Bryant, a 16-year-old girl, was fatally shot by police officer Nicholas Reardon in southeast Columbus, Ohio. Released body camera and security camera footage show Bryant brandishing a knife and charging two women consecutively, leading up to the moment Officer Reardon fired four shots; Bryant was struck at least once. Bryant immediately collapsed and was unresponsive. Reardon and other officers on the scene administered first aid, and she was transported to the hospital in critical condition, where she was later pronounced dead. Reactions from the public included both support of the actions of the officer and protests against the killing. The case was investigated by state authorities and then referred to local authorities. The case went to a grand jury and on March 11, 2022, it declined to charge Reardon. Her shooting, which prevented her from stabbing another girl, was later deemed a justifiable homicide.

== People involved ==
=== Ma'Khia Bryant ===
Ma'Khia Bryant was a 16-year-old girl who lived in suburban Columbus, Ohio. (Note: Bryant previously lived in Dayton) In February 2019, she and three of her siblings were removed from their mother and lived with their paternal grandmother for 16 months. After the landlord refused to allow their grandmother to have the children, Bryant and her sister were placed in group homes in foster care with the Franklin County Children Services system. On February 14, 2021, she moved into the private foster home where the shooting later occurred, joining her 15-year-old sister who had already been living there for a year. Bryant's foster mother described her as a quiet, untroubled girl who did not start fights.

=== Nicholas Reardon ===
Nicholas Reardon is a police officer who was 23 years old at the time of the incident, and had been hired by the Columbus Division of Police in December 2019. He served in the Ohio Air National Guard 121st Security Forces Squadron for almost two years before becoming a police officer.

=== Tionna Bonner ===
Tionna Bonner, a 22-year-old former foster child of Angela Moore.

== Incident ==
External videos
- Columbus Police show body cam footage of officer shooting, killing teen girl, YouTube video by NBC4 Columbus

Bryant and her younger sister resided in foster care at the home of Angela Moore. On April 20, 2021, one of Moore's former foster children, a young Black woman, Tionna Bonner, aged 22, was alone with Bryant and her younger sister after they returned home from school. Following a dispute over housework, Bonner called another former foster child of Moore's, Shai-Onta Lana Craig-Watkins, age 20, and Bryant's sister called her grandmother. When Moore came home from work, she was told that Bryant and the two women were arguing about housekeeping. Bryant's sister and grandmother have said Bonner pulled out a knife, and Bryant took a steak knife from the kitchen.

Bryant's sister called 911 at 4:32 p.m., saying, "We got Angie's grown girls, trying to fight us, trying to stab us, trying to put her hands on our grandma. Get here now!" Around 4:45 pm EDT, officers from the Columbus Division of Police responded to a 911 call reporting an attempted stabbing at the foster home.

As Officer Reardon arrived at the home, surveillance footage from multiple angles showed several people in the driveway, including Bryant, who had emerged from behind the house. Reardon can be heard saying, "Hey. What's going on?" Bryant then pushed Craig-Watkins in front of Reardon and fell over her. Bryant's father, who had arrived earlier to aid his daughters, tried to kick Craig-Watkins. Reardon drew his service pistol and shouted "Hey!" four times.

Brandishing a knife, Bryant shouted "I'm gonna stab the fuck out of you, bitch," and lunged toward Bonner, pinning her to a car. Reardon yelled at Bryant "Get down!" four times. As Bryant reached back with the knife, Reardon fired four shots, striking Bryant, who collapsed on the driveway.

Police officers administered CPR until emergency responders arrived. Bryant was transported to Mount Carmel East, where she was pronounced dead at 5:21 pm EDT.

== Reactions ==
Protesters marching on April 21

Later that evening, Interim Chief of Police Michael Woods held a press conference about the shooting. Woods stated that the department's use of force policies permitted deadly force to protect the officer's own life or the life of another person. On April 21, Woods held another press conference, during which he released more body camera footage and played two 911 calls relating to the shooting. During the first, the caller tells the dispatcher that there were girls trying to stab them. Mayor Andrew Ginther said that the footage from the cruiser camera would be released later that day or the following morning.

About 50 protesters gathered in Downtown Columbus on the night of the shooting; more gathered as they marched to the police headquarters to protest the shooting. At 2 p.m. on April 21, over 500 Ohio State University students marched from the Ohio Union to the Ohio Statehouse, chanting "Black Lives Matter" and "Say her name". More than 150 protesters gathered for a vigil for Bryant followed by a march to Columbus Division of Police headquarters later that day. At 9:30 p.m., a group of between 200 and 250 protesters marched to the Ohio Judicial Center. Within a few days of the killing, other protests occurred in Denver, Colorado, Miami, Florida, and Sacramento, California.

Over the following days, multiple experts on use of force policies stated that Reardon acted with reasonable use of force that was legally justified. Those interviewed included Philip Stinson, a Bowling Green State University criminal justice professor, and James Scanlon, a Columbus Division of Police veteran and former trainer who served as an expert witness at use-of-force trials. The two said guns are an appropriate response to situations involving lethal force, and that police are trained to target a person's center mass, in order to effectively neutralize the threat. Stinson stated that if Reardon had failed to act, it would likely have led to serious bodily harm or death. Geoffrey Alpert and Seth Stoughton, criminology and criminal justice professors and use-of-force experts at the University of South Carolina, concurred that the use of deadly force seemed appropriate.

Some people supported the police officer's actions. Mayor Ginther said that, "based on this footage, the officer took action to protect another young girl in our community", calling the shooting a tragic day. On Face the Nation, Democratic Congresswoman and former police chief Val Demings said, "But the limited information that I know in viewing the video, it appears that the officer responded as he was trained to do with the main thought of preventing a tragedy and a loss of life of the person who was about to be assaulted." CNN commentators Chris Cuomo and Don Lemon agreed that if the officer had not reacted in the time that he did, Bonner could have been killed, resulting in two tragic deaths instead of one. Conservative commentator Meghan McCain stated "she was about to stab another girl and I think the police officer did what he thought he had to do."

However, some others did not support the measures taken by police. Jen Psaki, the White House Press Secretary, told reporters that President Joe Biden had been briefed on the situation, and that the shooting was tragic, making reference to higher rates of police violence experienced by Black and Latino communities and the particular vulnerabilities of children in foster care. In addition to Psaki, Senators Cory Booker and Raphael Warnock voiced concerns that the killing pointed to the need for police reform to address "systemic racism and implicit bias". Professional basketball player LeBron James posted a tweet of an image of Reardon captioned "YOU'RE NEXT", referring to the conviction of Derek Chauvin, and then deleted it. Liberal commentator Joy Behar stated that the police should have shot the air and there is "something wrong if the only solution to someone potentially killing another human is to use deadly force."

Bryant's parents, Paula Bryant and Myron Hammonds reacted to their daughter's killing with outrage, with Bryant saying "my daughter dispatched Columbus police for protection, not to be a homicide", and Hammonds calling his daughter "my peacemaker" and saying "to know Ma'Khia is to know life." On April 28, 2021, the family of Ma'Khia Bryant and their lawyer, Michelle Martin, held a press conference and called for a federal investigation into Bryant's death and Ohio's foster care system. Bryant's funeral was held on April 30 in Columbus.

== Investigation ==
Investigation of the shooting was transferred to the Ohio Bureau of Criminal Investigation (BCI), which is routine for all police shootings in Columbus, Ohio. On July 7, 2021, it was announced that the BCI completed its investigation. Following normal procedure, the investigation did not include the determination of fault or charges. The case was referred to the Franklin County Prosecutor G. Gary Tyack.

On July 7, 2021, the county prosecutor's office said that the case would be assigned to Columbus attorneys H. Tim Merkle and Gary Shroyer as Special Prosecutors. On August 16, 2021, the county coroner reported that the death was a homicide. The case went to a grand jury, which, on March 11, 2022, declined to charge officer Nicholas Reardon because there was not probable cause that he committed a crime. It was later deemed a justifiable homicide with prosecutors noting "Under Ohio law the use of deadly force by a police officer is justified when there exists an immediate or imminent threat of death or serious bodily injury to the officer or another."

== See also ==
- List of killings by law enforcement officers in the United States, April 2021
