= Killing of Iremamber Sykap =

Killing of teenager by Honolulu police officers

- Date: April 5, 2021; 5 years ago
- Location: Kalākaua Avenue, Honolulu, Hawaii
- Type: Police killing
- Cause: Gunshot wound
- Filmed by: Police body camera
- Participants: Iremamber Sykap (casualty); Geoffrey H.L. Thom (police officer who fired fatal shot); Christopher Fredeluces (police officer); Zackary K. Ah Nee (police officer)
- Deaths: Iremamber Sykap
- Charges: Second-degree murder (Thom), Attempted second-degree murder (Fredeluces and Ah Nee)
- Verdict: Charges dismissed in district court
- Convictions: None

On April 5, 2021, Micronesian 16-year-old Iremamber Sykap was killed on Kalākaua Avenue when Honolulu police officer Geoffrey Thom fired 10 rounds at Sykap through the rear window of a stolen car after it had stopped at an intersection following a police pursuit. Thom was charged with second-degree murder for the shooting, and two other Honolulu Police Department officers were charged with attempted second-degree murder. The charges were dismissed in district court on August 18, 2021.

== Background ==
On April 5, 2021, officers from the Honolulu Police Department shot at a stolen Honda Accord with six occupants between the ages of 14 and 22, killing 16-year-old Micronesian teen Iremamber Sykap. The department stated that Sykap had been driving the car, that the car was stolen from Kailua, and that it was linked to multiple crimes including an armed robbery in Moiliili that occurred 20 minutes before the shooting. Hours after the shooting, chief of police Susan Ballard told reporters that officers had fired at the car while it rammed two marked police vehicles and drove through a fence into Kalakaua Canal, attributing the decision to open fire to the officers' knowledge that the occupants of the car had been involved in recent crimes.

== Shooting ==
In May 2021, Hawaii News Now obtained bodycam footage of the shooting from a camera on the officer who shot first. In the footage as described by Hawaii News Now, the officer is a passenger in a squad car, and repeatedly says "stop the vehicle" during the pursuit. The Honda Accord stops, and the officer subsequently gets out of the squad car, drops and then recovers his rifle, moves behind the Honda, and fires ten shots at the back of the driver's seat. The Honda then accelerates through a fence and into the canal.

== Legal proceedings ==
On May 21, 2021, Sykap's mother and grandmother filed a wrongful death lawsuit against the involved officers and the City & County of Honolulu. The suit alleged that the Honolulu Police Department had intimidated relatives of Sykap and was withholding information about the shooting. Eric A. Seitz, the attorney representing Sykap's mother and grandmother in the suit, said that witness statements and bodycam video showed that the car was not moving when officers fired into it and that "the shooting was entirely unnecessary and unwarranted". Also in May 2021, the Civil Beat Law Center for the Public Interest made a public records request for all police bodycam footage to be released, then sued the Honolulu Prosecutor's office after they denied the request on the basis that the investigation was still open and release of the footage could "poison the jury pool". The suit argued that the existence of an open investigation is not a valid reason to block government records from the public.

As of June 3, 2021, the Honolulu Police Department continued to consider the shooting justifiable and had not officially released any bodycam footage. A medical report released by Eric Seitz showed that a shot to the back of the head was the cause of Sykap's death, and that he was also hit by two bullets in the back of his right shoulder and one in the back of his left.

On the afternoon of June 9, 2021, the Honolulu Prosecutor's office released a statement that it had presented evidence to a grand jury, which declined to indict any of the three officers that the office intended to prosecute. Eric Seitz expressed a desire to access transcripts of the jury proceedings, which William S. Richardson School of Law professor Kenneth Lawson said would be the only way for the public to know what evidence was presented.

On June 17, 2021, prosecutors charged Officer Geoffrey H.L. Thom with second-degree murder, and Officers Christopher Fredeluces and Zackary K. Ah Nee with attempted second-degree murder. The trial marked the first time in over 40 years that a Honolulu police officer has been charged in a fatal shooting. On August 18, District Court Judge William Domingo dismissed charges against all three officers, ruling that there was "no probable cause" for murder or attempted murder. Honolulu Prosecutor Steve Alm expressed disappointment and disagreement with the dismissal of charges, but indicated that his office would not appeal the ruling or continue to pursue legal action against the three officers involved.

On September 30, 2021, Hawaii state judge Jeffrey Crabtree ruled that all police bodycam footage connected to the killing must be released. A spokesman for the office of Honolulu County Prosecutor Steve Alm declined to say whether the office would release the footage or appeal the ruling.

== Public response ==
On September 7, 2021, retired Honolulu police training officer John Frierson publicly criticized the actions of the three officers involved in the shooting. Frierson, who was previously called to testify for the prosecution at a preliminary hearing but was barred from doing so because the judge said the defense had not had time to prepare, said that the involved officers did not follow their training.

== See also ==
- Killing of Lindani Myeni
