= Craig Wolff =

American journalist and author

Craig Wolff is an American journalist and author and a former sports, feature, and news writer for The New York Times. He was a journalism professor at the Columbia University Graduate School of Journalism. He is also a former senior enterprise editor and writer at The Star-Ledger of Newark, N.J.

While reporting for The New York Times, Wolff was part of the team that won the Pulitzer Prize for coverage of the 1993 World Trade Center bombing. He also covered the story of Tawana Brawley, which he and four of his colleagues turned into Outrage: The Story Behind the Tawana Brawley Hoax.

He shared in a second Pulitzer Prize in 2017 as an editor for an investigative project examining an NYPD enforcement policy targeting people of color and minority-owned businesses; presented jointly to ProPublica and the New York Daily News.

In 2003, he co-wrote My Heart Will Cross This Ocean: My Story, My Son, Amadou with Kadiatou Diallo, the mother of police brutality victim Amadou Diallo. It won a 2004 Christopher Award for "work that raises the human spirit."

== Books ==
- Tennis Superstars: The Men
- Outrage: The Story Behind the Tawana Brawley Hoax
- My Heart Will Cross This Ocean: My Story, My Son, Amadou (2003)
