= Killing of Ousmane Zongo =

Police killing of Burkinabe art trader

Shooting of Ousmane Zongo
- Date: May 22, 2003; 23 years ago
- Location: Manhattan, New York City, New York, U.S.
- Also known as: Ousmane Zongo shooting: Ousmane Zongo (deceased); Brian Conroy (police officer)
- Outcome: Ousmane Zongo's death
- Deaths: 1
- Verdict: Guilty
- Convictions: Criminally negligent homicide

Ousmane Zongo (c. 1960 – May 22, 2003) was a Burkinabé arts trader living in the United States who was shot and killed by Brian Conroy, a New York City Police Department officer, during a warehouse raid on May 22, 2003. Zongo was not armed. Conroy did not receive any jail time but was convicted of criminally negligent homicide, received probation, and lost his job as a police officer.

== Incident ==
Police had targeted a Manhattan storage facility while investigating a CD/DVD infringement operation. Zongo repaired art and musical instruments at the same location but was never implicated in any way in the scheme. The shooter, NYPD officer Bryan Conroy, was disguised as a postal worker. He was guarding a bin of CDs when Zongo appeared to turn on a light. A chase ensued that ended when Zongo ran into a dead end. Conroy shot Zongo four times, once in the back. The NYPD later admitted Zongo had nothing to do with the counterfeiting and prosecutors contended Zongo ran from Conroy because he was frightened and confused when Conroy, who was not in police uniform, drew his weapon. The case drew parallels to that of Amadou Diallo, an unarmed immigrant from Guinea who was shot and killed by New York City Police Department officers in the Bronx in 1999. Al Sharpton led protests against alleged police brutality and racial profiling and was involved in getting Zongo's family from Burkina Faso to attend court proceedings.

Justice Robert H. Straus convicted Conroy of criminally negligent homicide, while clearing the officer of the more serious charge of second-degree manslaughter, which has a maximum sentence of 15 years in prison. The judge convicted him after a jury deadlocked, 10–2 in favor of conviction, on the manslaughter charge in his first trial in March. Conroy did not receive any jail time but was convicted of criminally negligent homicide and was given five years' probation, automatically losing his job with the NYPD.

== Family ==
Zongo's widow, Salimata Sanfo, and his two children live in Burkina Faso.

== See also ==
- List of unarmed African Americans killed by law enforcement officers in the United States
- Lists of killings by law enforcement officers in the United States
