= Killing of Alfred Olango =

2016 fatal police shooting in El Cajon, California

- Date: September 27, 2016
- Time: 2:10 p.m. (PST)
- Location: El Cajon, California, U.S.
- Filmed by: A bystander in a restaurant and the restaurant's drive-thru camera
- Participants: El Cajon police officers
- Deaths: Alfred Olango
- Charges: None filed

On September 27, 2016, Alfred Olango, a 38-year old former refugee from Uganda, was shot and killed by police responding to a 911 call occurred in El Cajon, California, United States. He died later that day in a hospital. Officers on scene claimed to have believed Olango was pointing a firearm; the object in his hand was an e-cigarette. The shooting sparked days of protests in El Cajon and around San Diego County.

San Diego County prosecutors declined to file charges against officers who were involved in the shooting.

== Alfred Olango ==
Alfred Okwera Olango (born 1978) arrived in the U.S. as a refugee from Uganda in 1991.

Born in Kampala to an Acholi family, Olango spent most of his childhood in various refugee camps around Gulu as an internally displaced person during the civil war, regularly fleeing from camp to camp, reportedly due to the Lord's Resistance Army insurgency. In 1991, he came to New York with his mother and eight siblings as refugees. He married in 2001, having one child with his wife at the time. He worked at Toro manufacturing and McDonald's, and he hoped to one day open his own restaurant.

== Shooting ==
Days before the incident, one of Olango's longtime childhood friends died. On the day of the incident, Olango's sister noticed strange behavior from him and called police three times asking for immediate help. A 5150 (involuntary psychiatric hold) request for a psychiatric emergency response team (PERT) was placed. Fifty minutes after the first call, at least two non-PERT officers arrived on scene.

=== Video evidence ===
In video footage released by the El Cajon Police Department, two uniformed police officers can be seen approaching Olango. In the video, Olango is retreating into a corner formed by a fence and an unoccupied parked truck. Olango's sister can be seen approaching behind the police officers. Seconds later, Olango drew an object and extended it in two hands towards police in a shooting stance before being shot. He was pronounced dead at a nearby hospital later that day.

=== Police statement ===
According to the El Cajon Police Department's statement on the evening of the shooting, Olango was simultaneously tasered and shot several times by the two officers. They said Olango refused to comply with instructions to remove one concealed hand from a pocket, paced back and forth, then "rapidly drew an object from his front pants pocket, placed both hands together and extended them rapidly toward the officer taking up what appeared to be a shooting stance". Officers claimed to have believed that Olango was pointing a handgun at officers, in which the object was a vape pen which was pointed towards the officers with the tip facing. Ultimately, a civil jury unanimously believed this version of events.

== Investigation ==
Footage of Olango's shooting was released by the El Cajon Police Department on September 30, 2016. There have been two videos of the shooting that were recorded and released to the public, one from a bystander inside a Mexican restaurant and the other from the restaurant's drive-thru surveillance camera.

In January 2017, San Diego County District's Attorney Bonnie Dumanis announced that no criminal charges would be filed against the two officers.

=== Civil Trial ===
On July 31, 2019, a jury in San Diego County Superior Court voted 12-0 that the shooting of Olango was proper. The jury found that the officer who shot Olango was not negligent. Officer Gonsalves and the City of El Cajon were represented by Mitch Dean, now with the firm of Dean Gazzo Roistacher LLP in Solana Beach, CA.

=== Criticism ===
The American Civil Liberties Union (ACLU) has criticized the El Cajon Police Department's partial release of video evidence. On the evening of the incident, a single still frame image from the cellphone footage was released.

== See also ==
- Killing of Amadou Diallo
- List of unarmed African Americans killed by law enforcement officers in the United States
- Ugandan Americans
