= Killing of Amadou Diallo =

1999 police shooting of a Guinean-American man

- Amadou Diallo
- Date: February 4, 1999; 27 years ago
- Time: 12:40 AM EST
- Location: New York City, U.S.; 40°49′39.1″N 73°52′48.1″W
- Type: Police killing, shooting
- Participants: Edward McMellon; Sean Carroll; Kenneth Boss; Richard Murphy
- Deaths: Amadou Diallo
- Charges: Second-degree murder Reckless endangerment
- Verdict: Not guilty
- Litigation: Lawsuit filed against city and officers for $61 million; settled for $3 million Daniels, et al. v. the City of New York (class-action lawsuit)

In the early hours of February 4, 1999, 23-year-old Amadou Diallo, an unarmed Guinean student, was struck with 19 of 41 rounds fired by four New York City Police Department plainclothes officers: Sean Carroll, Richard Murphy, Edward McMellon, and Kenneth Boss. Carroll later claimed to have mistaken Diallo for a rape suspect from one year earlier.

The four officers, who were part of the Street Crime Unit, which had expanded in size under mayor Rudy Giuliani, were charged with second-degree murder and acquitted at trial in Albany, New York. A firestorm of controversy erupted after the event, as the circumstances of the shooting prompted outrage both within and beyond New York City. Issues such as police brutality, racial profiling, and contagious shooting were central to the ensuing controversy.

== Early life ==
Diallo was born on September 2, 1975 as one of four children born to Saikou and Kadiatou Diallo, who were part of a historic Fulbe trading family in Guinea. He was born while his father was working in Sinoe County, Liberia. Growing up, he moved with his family to Togo, Singapore, Thailand, and back to Guinea. In September 1996, he moved to New York City to live with other members of his family and started a business with his cousin. According to his family's lawyer, he sought to remain in the United States by filing a political asylum application, falsely claiming that he was from Mauritania and that his parents had been killed in fighting. He sold video cassettes, gloves, and socks on the sidewalk along 14th Street during the day.

== Death ==
In the early morning of February 4, 1999, Diallo was standing near his residence building after returning from a meal. At about 12:40 a.m., officers Edward McMellon, Sean Carroll, Kenneth Boss, and Richard Murphy were looking for a serial rapist in the Soundview section of the Bronx. While driving down Wheeler Avenue, the police officers observed Diallo standing in front of his building entrance looking up and down the street. They stopped their unmarked car intending to question Diallo. When they ordered Diallo to show his hands, he ran up into the building entrance and reached into his pocket to produce what turned out to be his wallet. Assuming Diallo was drawing a firearm, one officer fired as he was walking up the stairs. The recoil of the gun caused the officer to fall backwards. The other three officers, believing their partner was shot, fired their weapons. The four officers fired 41 shots with semi-automatic pistols, hitting Diallo 19 times, fatally wounding him. Eyewitness Sherrie Elliott stated that the police continued to shoot even though Diallo was already down.

The investigation found no weapons on or near Diallo; what he had pulled out of his jacket was a wallet. The internal NYPD investigation ruled that the officers had acted within policy, based on what a reasonable police officer would have done in the same circumstances. Nonetheless, the Diallo shooting led to a review of police training policy and switching away from the use of full metal jacket (FMJ) bullets.

On March 25, 1999, a Bronx grand jury indicted the four officers on charges of second-degree murder and reckless endangerment. On December 16, a court ordered a change of venue to Albany, New York, because of pretrial publicity. On February 25, 2000, after three days of deliberation, a jury composed of four black and eight white jurors acquitted the officers of all charges.

== Aftermath ==
The killing prompted an outpouring of protest, culminating in 1,200 arrests of protesters in New York City, as well as Rep. John Lewis and Rev. Al Sharpton becoming involved. The head of the NAACP urged the United States Attorney General to take action.

In March 2000, the United States Department of Justice found that the NYPD Street Crimes Unit, to which the four officers belonged, engaged in racial profiling.

In April 2000, Diallo's mother and father filed a $61 million lawsuit against the city and the officers, charging gross negligence, wrongful death, racial profiling, and other violations of Diallo's civil rights. In March 2004, they accepted a $3 million settlement, one of the largest in the City of New York for a single man with no dependents under New York State's "wrongful death law", which limits damages to financial loss by the deceased person's next of kin. Anthony H. Gair, representing the Diallo family, argued that federal common law should apply.

In April 2002, as a result of the killing of Diallo and other controversial actions, the Street Crime Unit was disbanded. In 2003, Diallo's mother published a memoir, My Heart Will Cross This Ocean: My Story, My Son, Amadou, with the help of author Craig Wolff.

Diallo's death became an issue in the 2005 New York City mayoral election. Bronx borough president and mayoral candidate Fernando Ferrer, who had protested against the circumstances of the killing at the time, was criticized by the Diallo family and many others for telling a meeting of police sergeants that although the shooting had been a tragedy, the officers had been "over-indicted".

Officer Kenneth Boss had previously been involved in an incident in which an unarmed black man was shot. After the trial, Boss was reassigned to desk duty, but in October 2012, Commissioner Raymond W. Kelly restored Boss's ability to carry a firearm. As of 2012, he was the only one of the four officers still working for the NYPD. In 2015, he was promoted to sergeant in accordance with state civil service law, which is not subject to review by top department officials. The next year, he was named "sergeant of the year" by his union. He retired from law enforcement in 2019.

A report from Capital New York reported that 85 IP addresses belonging to the New York Police Department had made changes to Wikipedia pages about NYPD misconduct and also to articles about people killed in police interventions, including this article. One of these edits changed the statement "Officer Kenneth Boss had previously been involved in an incident in which an unarmed man was shot, but continued to work as a police officer" to "Officer Kenneth Boss was previously involved in an incident in which a man armed was shot." Two policemen associated with these edits were reported to receive only "minor reprimands".

In April 2021, Diallo's mother commented on the conviction of Minneapolis police officer Derek Chauvin for the murder of George Floyd, saying "there’s no time for celebration" and instead there's "time for work" and "to put in the work that needed to be done, so we can stop seeing these cases time and time again". She said the verdict was "a right step in the right direction", but found it unclear whether the verdict had signaled broader changes in police accountability.

== Cultural references to Diallo ==
=== Music ===
- Bruce Springsteen's song "American Skin (41 Shots)"
- "Diallo" by Wyclef Jean;
- "New York City Cops" off The Strokes' debut album Is This It had the incident as the inspiration. Singer Julian Casablancas revealed that this was a political song influenced by the shooting of Amadou Diallo in a March 2018 Vulture interview.
- "I Find It Hard to Say (Rebel)" by Lauryn Hill;
- "Lament for the Late AD" by Terry Callier.
- The Public Enemy album There's a Poison Goin' On has a song titled "41:19" based on the number of rounds fired at and striking Diallo and contains lyrics concerning police harassment and violence.
- Electro pop band Le Tigre lamented the Diallo shooting in their song "Bang! Bang!", which ends with a vocal chorus counting numbers that ends with 41, the number of shots fired.
- The piece "Amadou Diallo", included in the album Ethnic Stew and Brew by jazz trumpeter Roy Campbell, Jr., was inspired by the shooting, ending with a rapid burst of notes replicating the 41 gunshots.
- The incident also served as the basis for Erykah Badu's track "A.D. 2000" (the abbreviation standing for Diallo's initials), from the album Mama's Gun.
- In the CD version of their album Let's Get Free, Dead Prez pays tribute to Amadou Diallo by putting a 41-track moment of silence between tracks 16 ("It's Bigger Than Hip-Hop") and 17 ("Propaganda").
- In his album The Beautiful Struggle, Talib Kweli speaks of "Brother Amadou as [...] a modern day martyr." Kweli makes further reference to the shooting in his song "The Proud": "It's in they job description to terminate the threat/So 41 shots to the body is what he can expect".
- The phrase "Mom, I'm going to college" is attributed as Amadou Diallo's last words, featured in the third movement of Joel Thompson's seven-movement cantata Seven Last Words of the Unarmed.
- The song "DPA (As Seen On T.V.)" by Company Flow (2000) makes a direct reference to Diallo and to the acquittal of the officers accused of his murder. In the lyrics, El-P raps “…or rock that polo vest with forty one magnets / and see if it metastasize when cornered by dragnet”.
- The song "FATHER FIGURE" by Tobe Nwigwe featuring Black Thought and Royce da 5'9 includes a reference to the shooting, as well as the killing of Breonna Taylor. In the lyrics, Royce da 5'9 raps "Probably pop a cop or two to honor Breonna or Amadou Diallo"
- The song "Thanks, Bastards!" by Mischief Brew includes the line: "So when there's 41 bullets, there's 41 thousand thorns in your side", referring to the number of bullets fired at Diallo, and observing the outrage which ensued.
- American metal band Trivium also made a track about the murder of Amadou, called "Contempt Breeds Contamination". It was released on their 2006 The Crusade album.
- The song "Welcome To The Terrordome" by Pharoahe Monch, a cover of the Public Enemy song of the same name, includes the line "They murdered Amadou Diallo" in its intro.
- The song "Things I've Seen" by Spooks, mentions him ("You bust, Amadou Diallo is us").
- "A Tree Never Grown" ft. A.L. (All Lyrics), Fre, Grafh, Invincible, Jane Doe, J-Live, Kofi Taha, Rubix, Tame One, Wordsworth & Yasiin Bey
- "One Dead Cop" by Leftover Crack, has the line "With the badge and a gun, braggin' how you blasted gunshot 41."
- The Beastie Boys reference that they won’t forget him on the song "We Got The" on their 2004 album To The 5 Boroughs.
- In the song "Somebody" by KRS-One, he raps: "Free Mumia Abu-Jamal from the cages/ We writes the pages and teach all ages/ Justice, tell me what we want now/ Justice, for Mumia Abu-Jamal/ Or justice for Amadou Diallo/ Justice, there is no peace without Justice"
- "The Balad of Amadou Diallo" by Steve Blackwell & Friends on the 2021 album "And So It Grows" is about the killing of Amadou Diallo

=== Movies ===
- A group of human rights organizations completed The Day After Diallo, a short video about police violence against people of color in the context of the killing of Amadou Diallo. The video was co-produced by WITNESS, New York City Police Watch and The Ella Baker Center for Human Rights.
- The 2002 movie 25th Hour references "corrupt cops" with their "41 shots, standing behind a blue wall of silence" in reference to the killing of Amadou Diallo.
- In the 2002 movie Phone Booth, which is set in New York City, Kiefer Sutherland’s character The Caller tells Colin Farrell’s character Stu Shepard, “You know, you can be shot 41 times for just pulling out your wallet.”

=== Television ===
- The case is explored in the third episode of the Netflix miniseries Trial by Media titled "41 Shots".
- BBC Production: Louis Theroux's Weird Weekends Season 2 Episode 3. Louis Theroux visits New York City to explore various pro-black movements. The episode is filmed in the aftermath of Diallo's murder.
- In NYPD Blue, Season 6 Episode 20, they bring in 2 suspects who references the 41 shots that Diallo had received.
- In Blue Bloods, Season 6 Episode 19, "Blast from the Past," one of the officers who, shortly after 9/11, fired 61 shots at an unarmed Muslim teenager, is now up for promotion.

=== Visual arts ===
- A drawing by Art Spiegelman showing a police officer at a shooting gallery with a banner reading "41 shots 10¢" was featured on the cover of The New Yorker on March 8, 1999. 250 police officers picketed the magazine's headquarters in response.
- Jack Whitten created a sculptural piece in remembrance titled Totem 2000 IV: For Amadou Diallo (2000), constructed with Spinel Black pigment, acrylic, recycled glass, blood, and mixed media on board.

=== Books ===
- Ko, Lisa (2024). Memory Piece. New York: Riverhead. p. 148. ISBN 978-0-593-54210-1.

== See also ==
- List of unarmed African Americans killed by law enforcement officers in the United States
- Civil rights
- Killing of Alfred Olango
- List of killings by law enforcement officers in the United States
- New York City Police Department corruption and misconduct
- Police brutality in the United States
