= Rags Roberts =

American baseball player

- Outfielder
- Born: November 12, 1895; West Norfolk, Virginia, U.S.
- Died: July 25, 1963 (aged 67); Beckley, West Virginia, U.S.
- Threw: Right

Negro league baseball debut
- 1922, for the Harrisburg Giants

Last appearance
- 1928, for the Homestead Grays

Teams
- Harrisburg Giants (1922); Baltimore Black Sox (1922–1923); Homestead Grays (1928)

Harry Hamlet Roberts (November 12, 1895 – July 25, 1963), nicknamed "Rags", was an American Negro league baseball outfielder in the 1920s.

A native of West Norfolk, Virginia, Roberts made his Negro leagues debut in 1922 with the Harrisburg Giants and Baltimore Black Sox. He played for Baltimore again the following season, and finished his career in 1928 with the Homestead Grays. Roberts died in Beckley, West Virginia in 1963 at age 67.
