= West Norfolk (disambiguation) =

West Norfolk is a proposed unitary authority area in Norfolk, England.

West Norfolk may also refer to:

- West Norfolk (constituency), England
- West Norfolk, Virginia, neighborhood of Portsmouth, Virginia, United States
- King's Lynn and West Norfolk, borough of Norfolk, England, formed in 1974 as "West Norfolk"
- the western part of the county of Norfolk, England
