= Angelos Bible College =

College in Virginia, U.S.

- Former name: Angelos Bible Institute
- Motto: "Equipping Men and Women for 21st Century Leadership and Service" Ephesians 4-11-12
- Motto in English: The Messenger
- Type: Bible College
- Established: 1984
- Affiliations: Baptist
- Academic affiliations: Association of Christian Schools International American Association of Christian Colleges and Seminaries
- Chairman: Thomas Reese
- Chancellor: Allen R. McFarland
- President: Julian B. McGhee
- Doctoral students: None
- Location: Portsmouth, Virginia, United States; 36.7921°N 76.3439°W
- Colors: Red & black
- Website: www.angelos205.com

Angelos Bible College is a Bible college in Portsmouth, Virginia, United States. The college was founded by Dr. Allen R. McFarland senior pastor, Calvary Evangelical Baptist Church. Angelos is a member of Association of Christian Schools International and American Association of Christian Colleges and Seminaries. Angelos is approved to receive educational benefits for veterans earning degrees at the college. The college graduated its first class in 2001.
