= Portsmouth, Virginia =

- Independent city
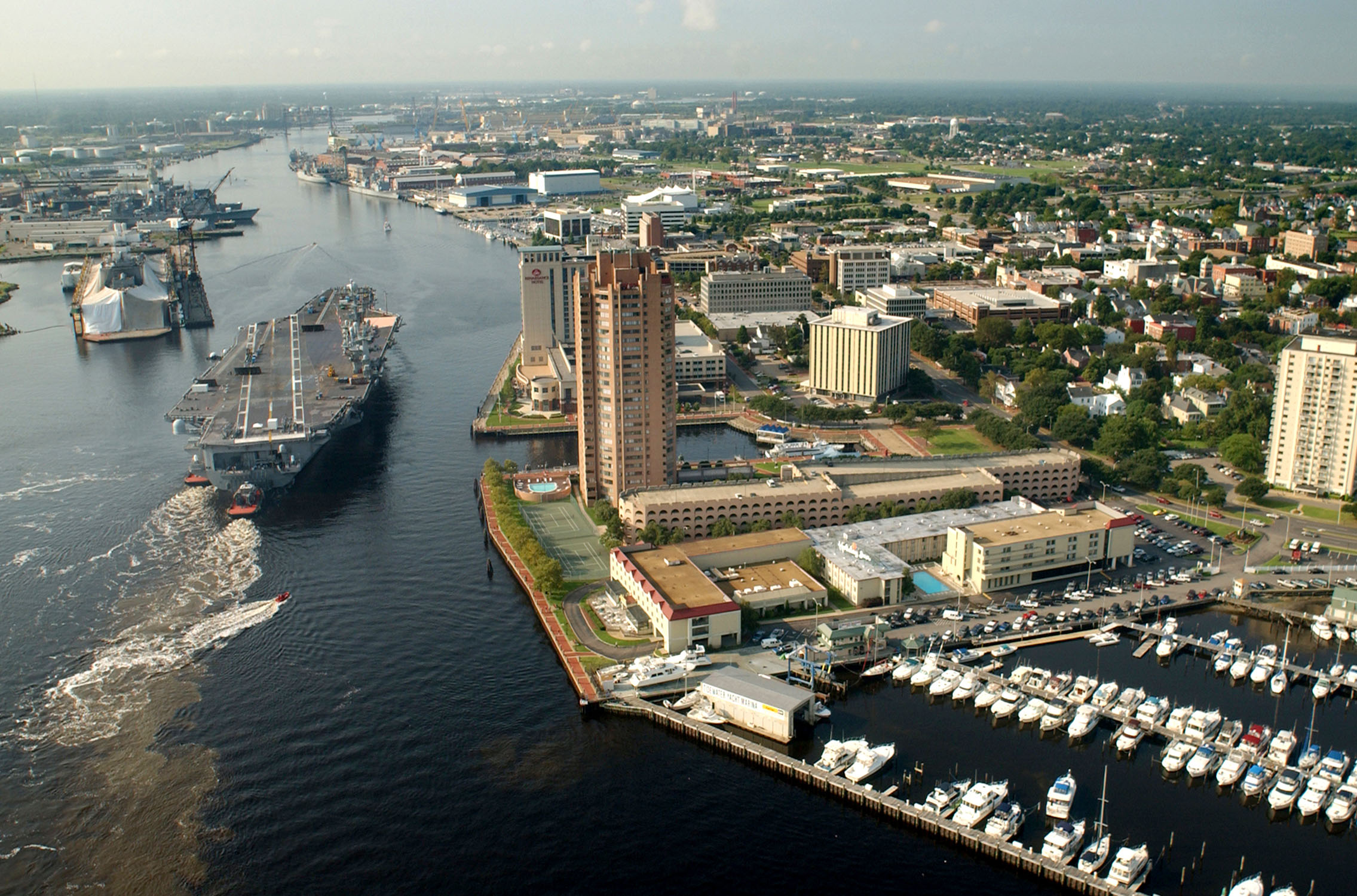
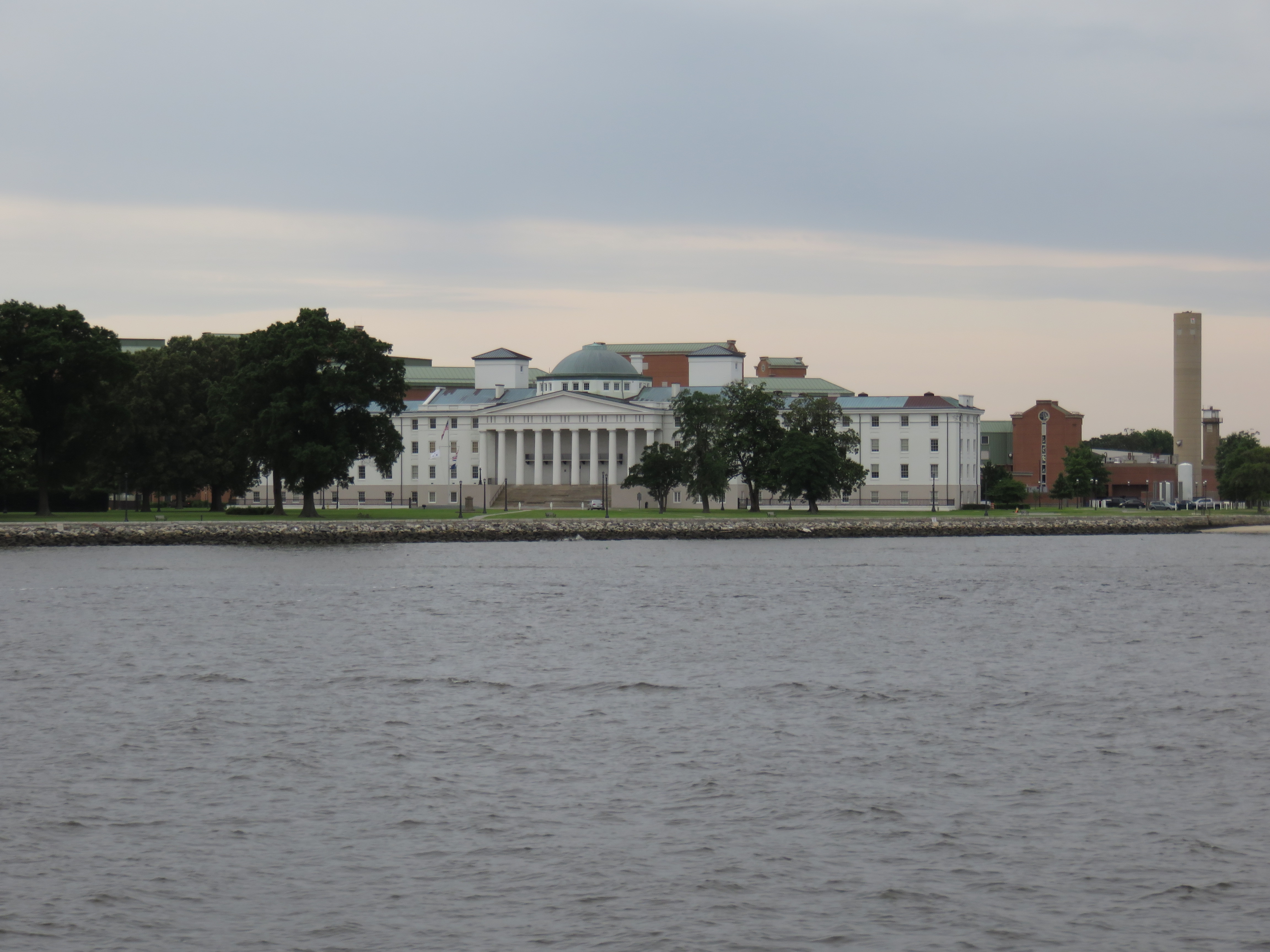
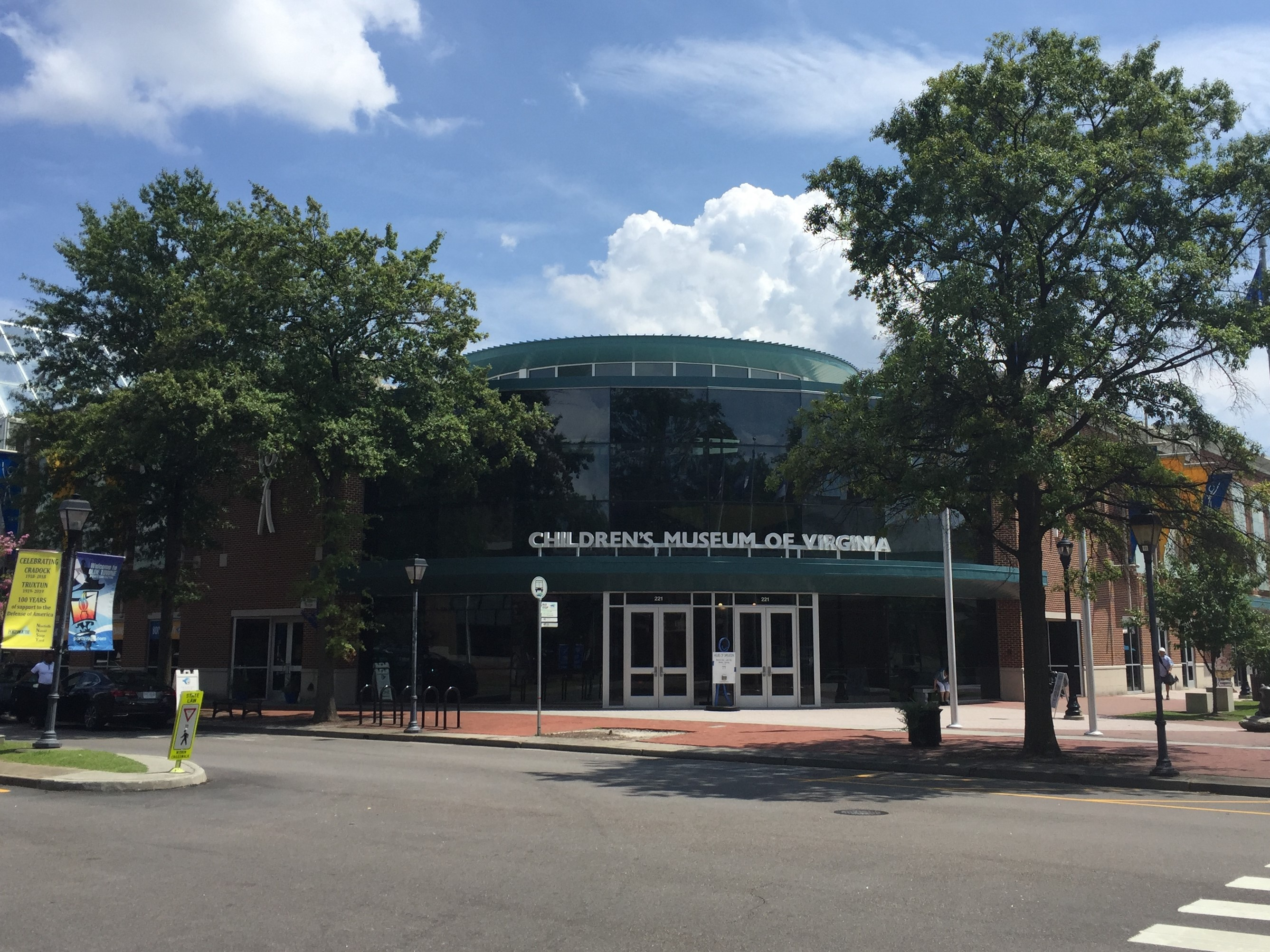
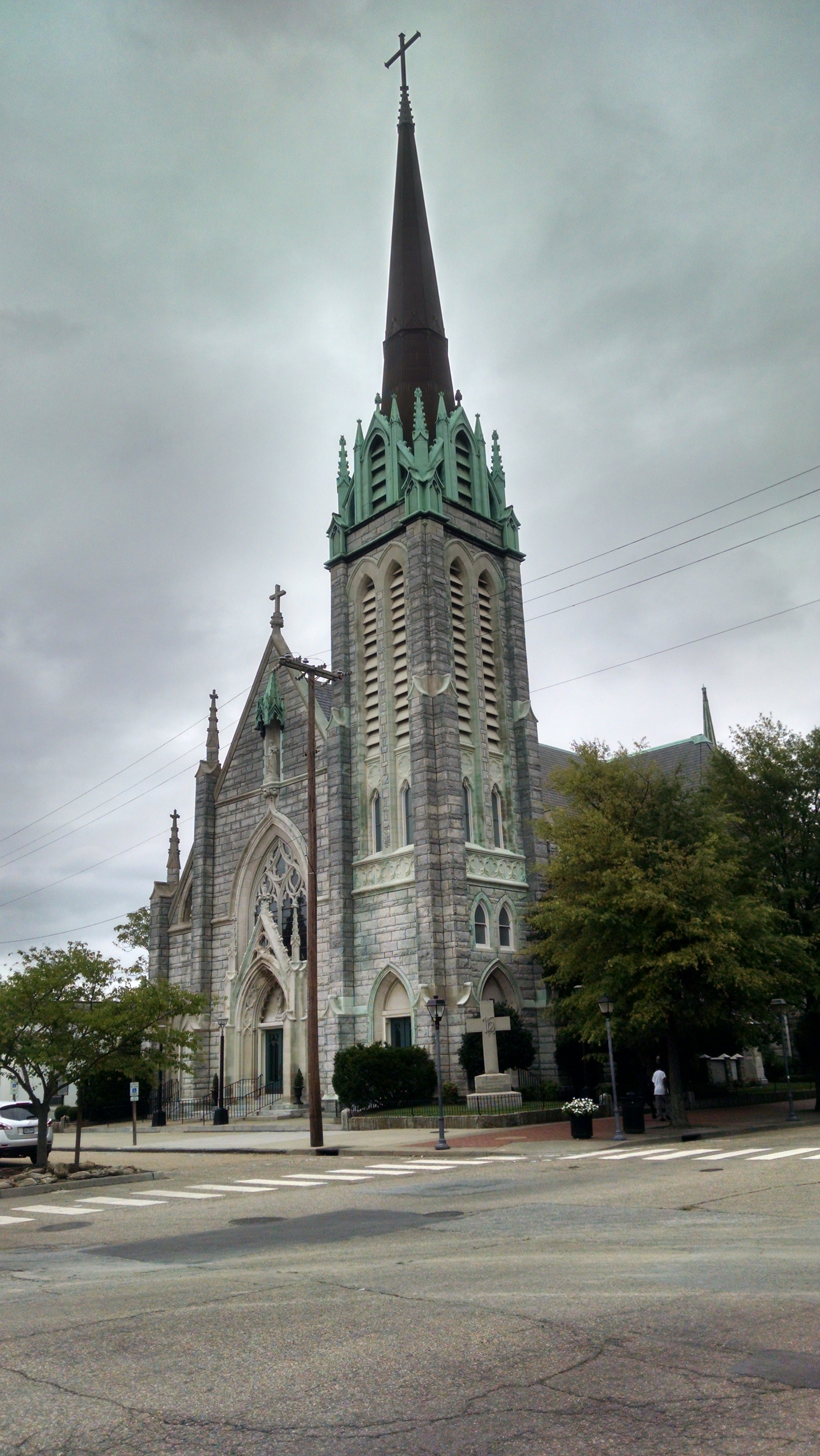
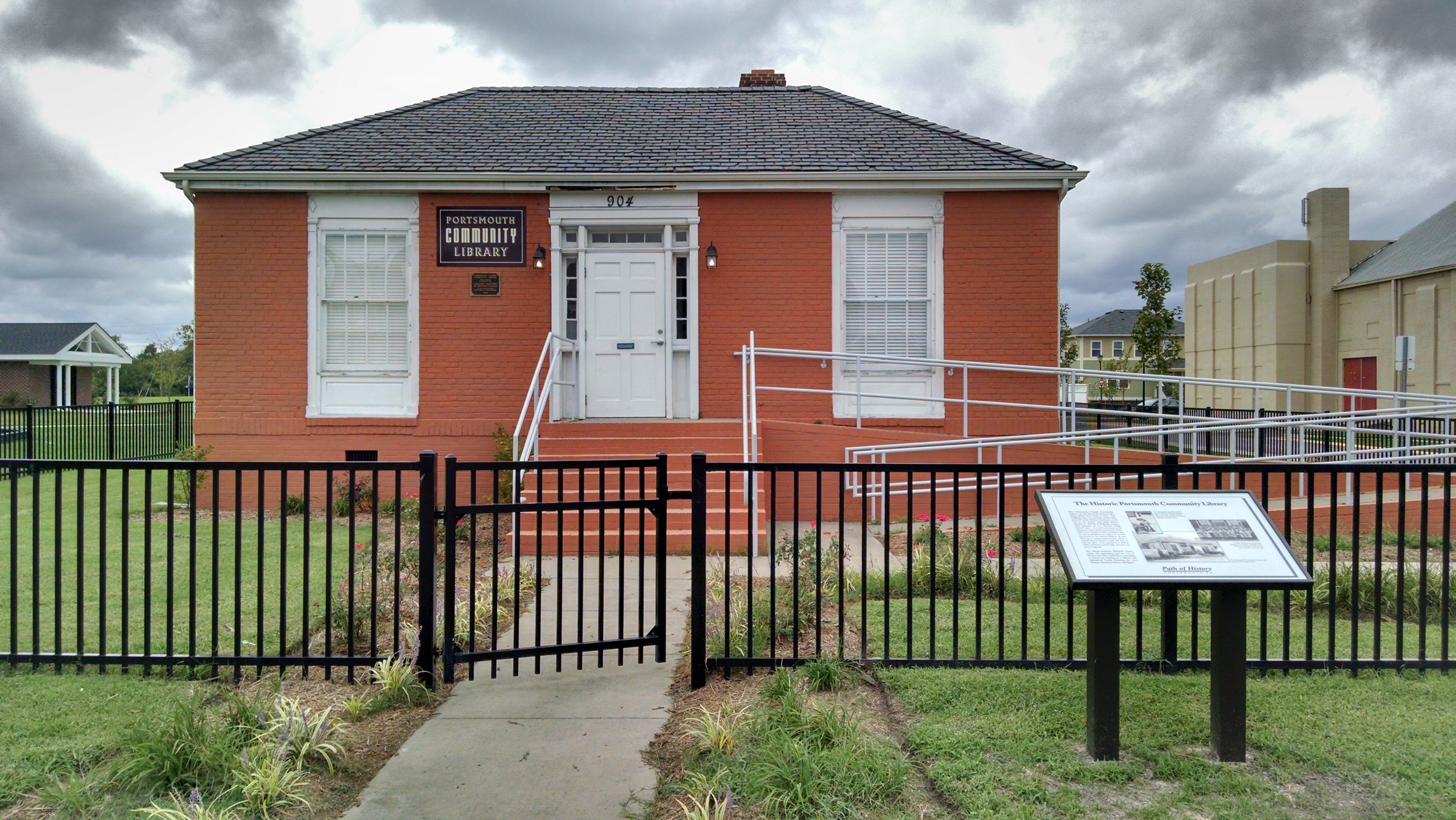
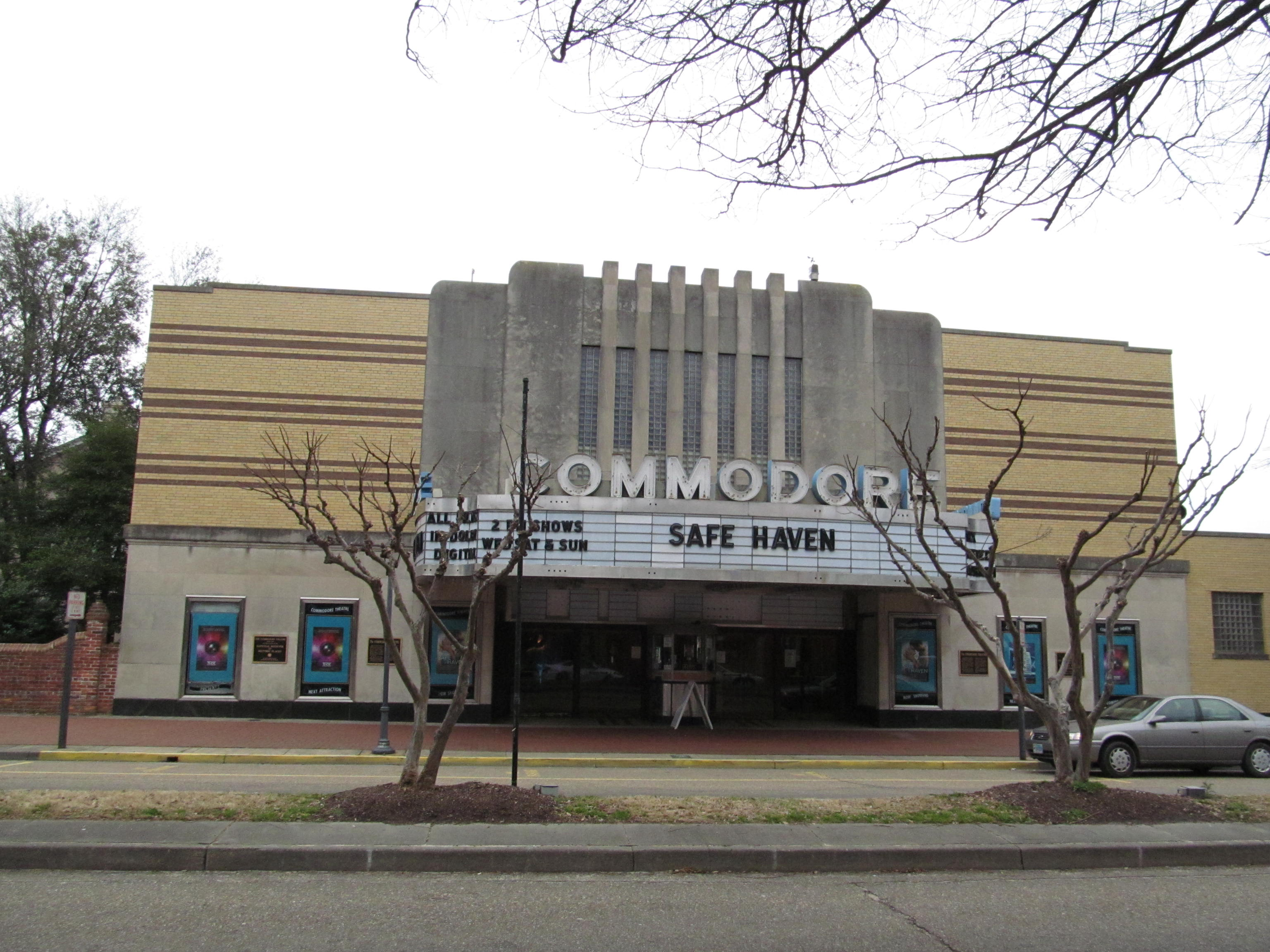
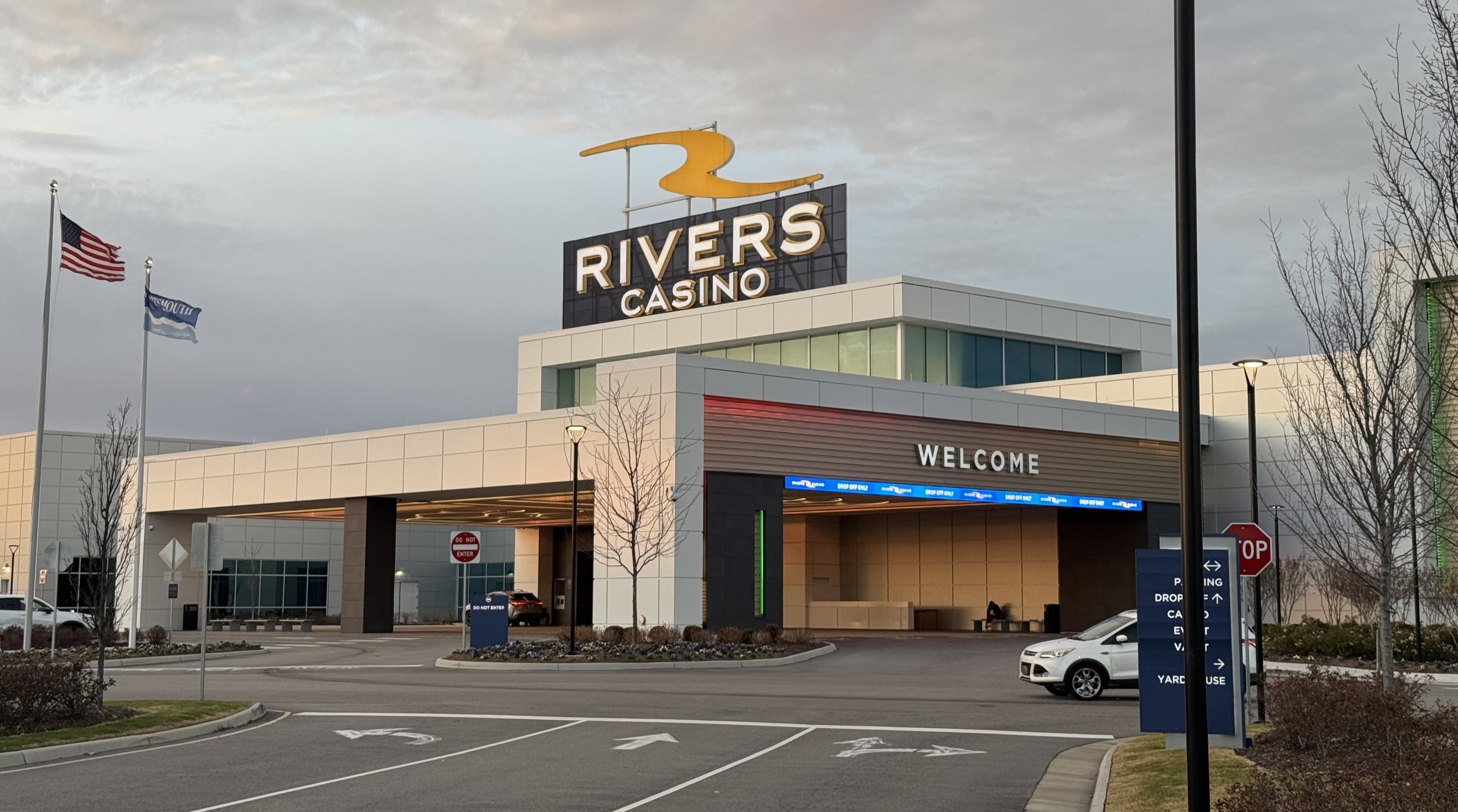
- Downtown Portsmouth on the Elizabeth River Naval Medical Center Portsmouth Children's Museum of Virginia St. Paul's Catholic Church Portsmouth Community Library Commodore Theatre Rivers Casino Portsmouth

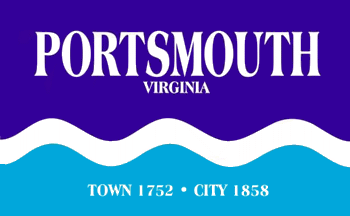
- Flag
- Interactive map of Portsmouth, Virginia
- Location within Virginia Location within the United States
- Coordinates: 36°50′04″N 76°20′30″W
- Country: United States
- State: Virginia
- County: None (Independent city)
- Founded: 1752
- Named for: Portsmouth, England

Government
  - Type: Mayor–council–manager
  - Mayor: Shannon Glover

Area
  - Total: 46.68 sq mi (120.91 km^{2})
  - Land: 33.30 sq mi (86.25 km^{2})
  - Water: 13.38 sq mi (34.66 km^{2})
- Elevation: 20 ft (6 m)

Population (2020)
  - Total: 97,915
  - Estimate (2025): 96,777 ▼
  - Rank: 9th in Virginia
  - Density: 2,940.39/sq mi (1,135.29/km^{2})
- Time zone: UTC−5 (EST)
  - Summer (DST): UTC−4 (EDT)
- ZIP Codes: 23701-23709
- Area codes: 757, 948
- FIPS code: 51-64000
- GNIS feature ID: 1497102
- Website: portsmouthva.gov

Portsmouth (/ˈpɔːrtsməθ/ PORTS-məth) is an independent city in southeastern Virginia, United States. It lies across the Elizabeth River from Norfolk. As of the 2020 census, the population was 97,915. It is the ninth-most populous city in Virginia and is part of the Hampton Roads metropolitan area. Due to its strategic location, the city has long been associated with the United States Armed Forces, particularly the Navy. The Norfolk Naval Shipyard is a historic and active Navy facility located in Portsmouth.

== History ==
=== Colonial era ===
In 1620, the future site of Portsmouth was recognized as a suitable shipbuilding location by John Wood, a shipbuilder, who petitioned King James I of England for a land grant. The surrounding area was soon settled as a plantation community.

Portsmouth was founded by Colonel William Crawford, a member of the Virginia House of Burgesses. It was established as a town in 1752 by an act of the Virginia General Assembly and was named for Portsmouth, England.

=== American Revolution and early United States ===
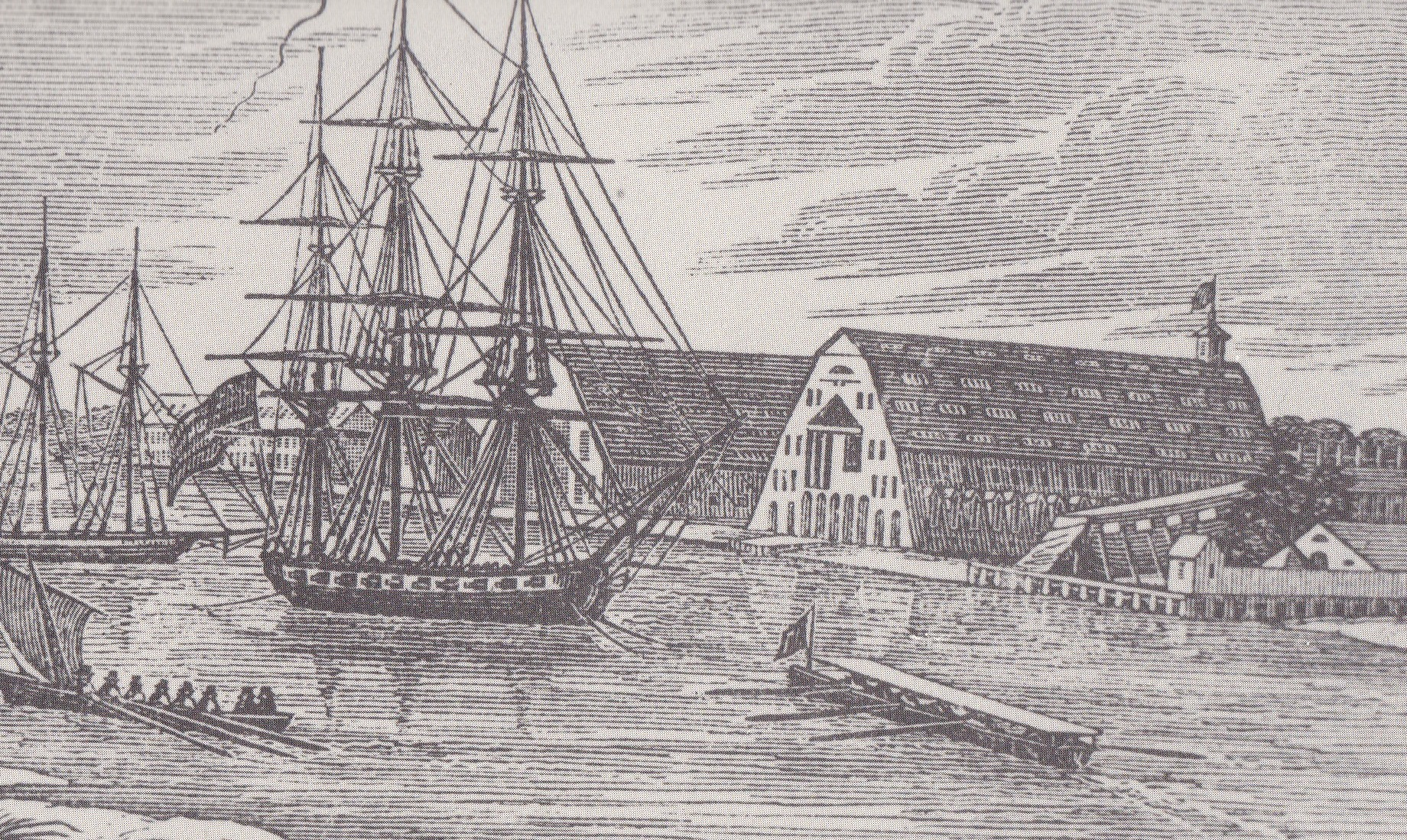
The Gosport Naval Shipyard c. 1840

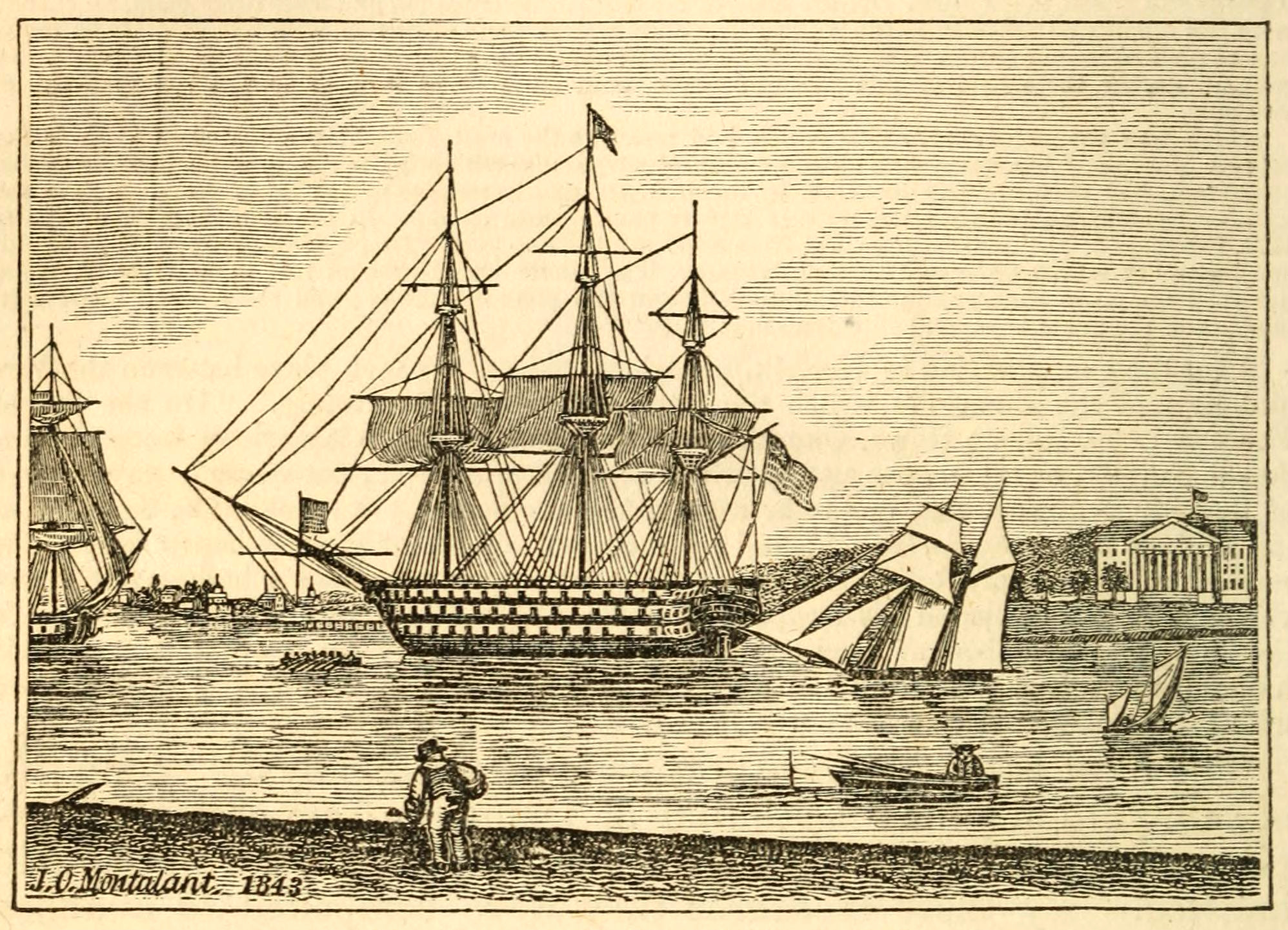
Portsmouth Harbor in 1843; the Naval Hospital is visible in the background

In 1767, Andrew Sprowle, a shipbuilder, founded the Gosport Shipyard adjacent to Portsmouth. The Gosport Shipyard at Portsmouth was owned by the Commonwealth of Virginia after the American Revolutionary War and was sold to the new United States federal government. In 1779, Portsmouth was sacked by British forces during the Revolutionary War.

Following the Revolutionary War, James Monroe invited Marquis de Lafayette to visit the United States. Lafayette accepted, and was celebrated with parades and balls all around the country. In October 1824, Lafayette visited the town, stopping to have tea at Hill House. In 1836, the town of Portsmouth was incorporated.

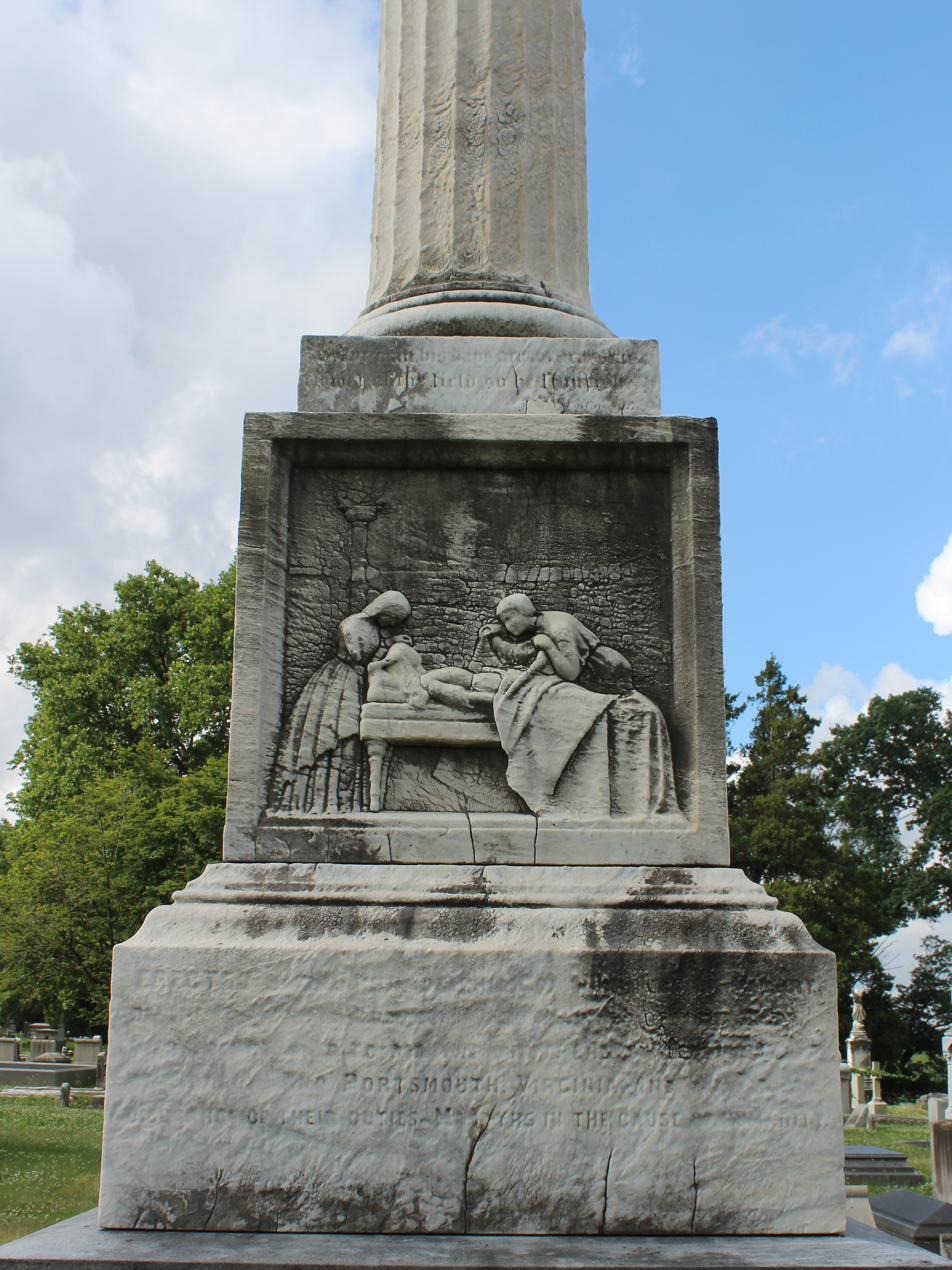
The Yellow Fever Memorial in Laurel Hill Cemetery was built to honor the "Doctors, Druggists and Nurses" from Philadelphia who helped fight the epidemic in Portsmouth

In 1855, the Portsmouth and Norfolk area suffered an epidemic of yellow fever which killed 1 of every three citizens. On June 6, 1855, the Benjamin Franklin vessel arrived in Hampton Roads for repairs. The ship had just sailed from the West Indies, where there had been an outbreak of yellow fever. The port health officer ordered the ship quarantined. After twelve days, a second inspection found no issues, so it was allowed to dock at the Gosport Shipyard in Portsmouth. Workers from the shipyard began to fall ill, and it was later discovered that the ship's captain had concealed sailors who were suffering from the disease. Some of the workers from the shipyard lived in Norfolk, and returned home by taking the ferry across the Elizabeth River, taking the yellow fever with them. The poor and immigrants were the first to fall ill. At the time, no one understood how the disease was transmitted, though it was later determined to have spread via mosquitoes and poor sanitation. This lack of understanding led to widespread panic, and about one-third of Portsmouth's 10,000 residents fled the region in the hopes of escaping the epidemic. New York banned all persons and vessels from the region, since both Norfolk and Portsmouth were infected. Washington, D.C., Baltimore, Richmond, Petersburg, and Suffolk also banned persons from the region. Mathews County and the Eastern Shore remained open to those fleeing the illness. The Gosport Navy Yard remained open, but more than 1,000 shipyard workers left. By the end of August, only 3,000 residents remained in Portsmouth. The number of infected reached 5,000 in September, and by the second week of September, a combined 1,500 had died in Norfolk and Portsmouth. As fall arrived and the weather cooled, the outbreak began to wane, leaving a final tally of about 3,200 dead in the region.

The Emanuel African Methodist Episcopal Church was built in 1857. During the 19th century, the church was part of the Underground Railroad. Freedom seekers from Virginia and other slave states used the church as a hiding place and refuge on their way to the abolitionist Northern United States. Individuals would hide in the basement, attic, and behind the organ until moving on to the next location.

In 1858, Portsmouth became an independent city, but it remained the seat of Norfolk County.

=== American Civil War and postbellum ===
During the American Civil War, in 1861, Virginia joined the Confederate States of America. Fearing that the Confederacy would take control of the shipyard at Portsmouth, the shipyard commander ordered the burning of the shipyard. The Confederate forces did in fact take over the shipyard and did so without armed conflict through an elaborate ruse orchestrated by civilian railroad builder William Mahone (soon to become a famous Confederate officer). The Union forces withdrew to Fort Monroe across Hampton Roads, which was the only land in the area which remained under Union control.

In early 1862, the Confederate ironclad warship CSS Virginia was rebuilt using the burned-out hulk of USS Merrimack. Virginia engaged the Union ironclad USS Monitor in the famous Battle of Hampton Roads during the Union blockade of Hampton Roads. The Confederates burned the shipyard again when they left in May 1862.

Following the recapture of Norfolk and Portsmouth by the Union forces, the name of the shipyard was changed to Norfolk Naval Shipyard. The name of the shipyard was derived from its location in Norfolk County. The Norfolk Naval Shipyard today is located entirely within the city limits of Portsmouth, Virginia. The Norfolk Naval Shipyard name has been retained to minimize any confusion with the Portsmouth Naval Shipyard, which itself is actually located in Kittery, Maine, across the Piscataqua River from Portsmouth, New Hampshire.

By 1870, the population of the city was 10,590.

In 1894, the city annexed portions of Norfolk County North of the city.

=== 20th century ===
In 1909, the city annexed additional areas west of the city that were previously part of Norfolk County. By 1910, due to the annexation and the city's growth, the population had increased to 33,190.

The Key Road School, the first school for Black children in the area, was founded in 1921 by Julius Rosenwald and Booker T. Washington. The school was open to students from first through seventh grade. In 1926, the school moved to a new building, with funding coming from the Black community, the Rosenwald Fund, and Norfolk County. The school closed in 1965. After the school ceased operations, the I.C. Norcom School Boosters briefly used the building as its headquarters. In 1971, the Olympian Sports Club, which sponsors Black youth athletics, began using the building. In 2017, the city sought to condemn and raze the former school building, but the African-American Historic Society of Portsmouth fought for the building to receive historic designation, and the building was preserved. It is marked with a Virginia Historical Highway Marker.

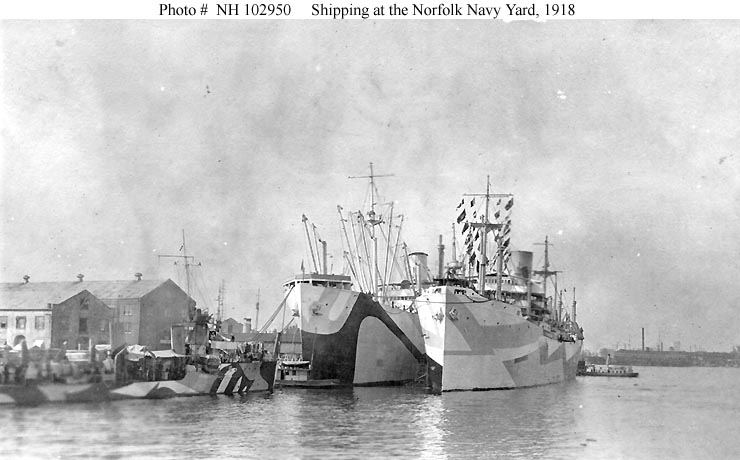
Camouflaged ships in Norfolk Navy Yard, Portsmouth, Virginia c. October 1918. From left to right: the destroyer Paul Jones, and cargo ships Katrina Luckenbach and Rondo.

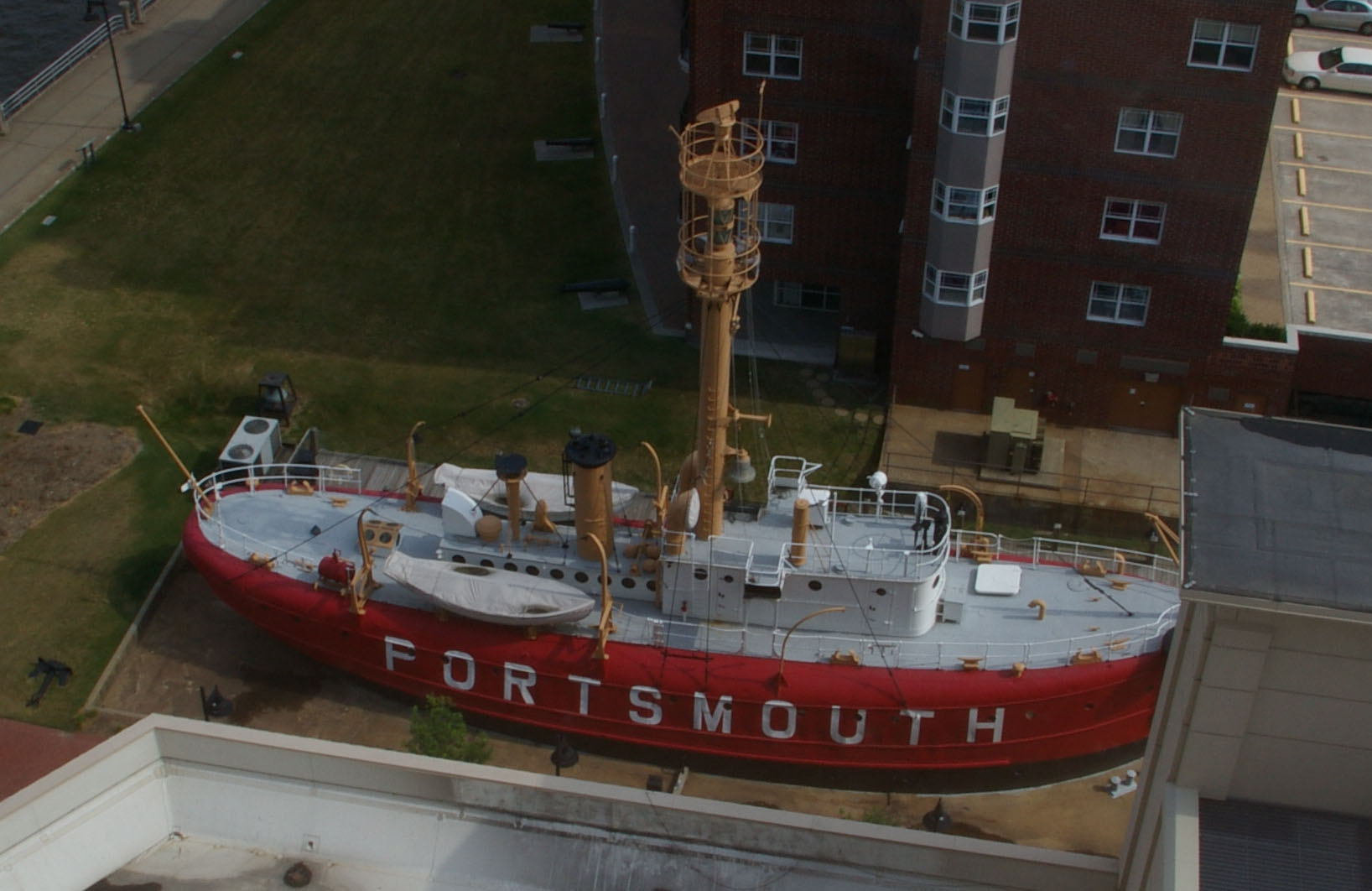
The Lightship Portsmouth is part of the Naval Shipyard Museum

During and after World War II, the shipyard flourished, and suburban development surrounded both Norfolk and Portsmouth. The Portsmouth Naval Shipyard Museum was established in 1949. In 1948, Portsmouth annexed additional areas from the county, expanding the city boundary westward to the Western Branch area. In 1960, Portsmouth annexed an additional ten square miles of Norfolk County, increasing the population by 36,000 residents. The total population in 1960 was 114,773. Portsmouth continued as the county seat of Norfolk County until 1963 when the new city of Chesapeake was formed in a political consolidation with the city of South Norfolk. In 1968, Portsmouth again annexed parts of Norfolk County, including ten square miles of land, 14 square miles of water area, and 11,000 residents. The newly annexed parts were all within the northern third of the Western Branch Borough. Portsmouth's other county neighbor, the former Nansemond County, also consolidated with a smaller city, forming the new city of Suffolk in 1974.

During the 1998 Hurricane Bonnie, the Naval Shipyard provided safe haven for vessels of the Atlantic Fleet that were unable to get underway.

=== 21st century ===
By 2000, the population of Portsmouth was 100,565. As one of the older cities of Hampton Roads, in the early 21st century, Portsmouth was undergoing moderate urban renewal in the downtown.

The APM "MAERSK" marine terminal for container ships opened in 2007 in the West Norfolk section.

By 2010, the population had decreased to 95,535. By 2020, the population had increased slightly for the first time in decades, with 97,915 residents.

=== Timeline ===
==== 18th century ====
- 1752 – Portsmouth founded by politician William Crawford; named after Portsmouth, England.
- 1767 – Gosport Shipyard, later renamed the Norfolk Naval Shipyard, founded by Andrew Sprowle.
- 1779 – Portsmouth sacked by British forces during the American Revolutionary War.

==== 19th century ====
- 1800s
  - 1805 – Dismal Swamp Canal opens.
- 1810s
  - 1812 – War of 1812 begins
  - 1813 – Craney Island Fort is completed
  - 1815 – War of 1812 ends.
- 1820s
  - 1821 – Fire.
  - 1822 – Norfolk-Portsmouth steam ferry begins operating.
  - 1824 – October 25: Lafayette visits Portsmouth.
  - 1827 – Norfolk Naval Hospital opens. It would later be renamed Naval Medical Center Portsmouth.
- 1830s
  - 1830 – Trinity Episcopal Church is established.
  - 1832 – Cedar Grove Cemetery is established.
  - 1834 – Drydock Number One, Norfolk Naval Shipyard is put into service.
  - 1836 – Town of Portsmouth incorporated.
  - 1837 – Portsmouth & Roanoke Railroad begins operating.
- 1840s
  - 1840 – Population: 6,477.
  - 1846 – Norfolk County Courthouse built.
- 1850s
  - 1850 – Population: 8,626.
  - 1855 – Yellow fever outbreak begins in Portsmouth and later spreads to Norfolk.
  - 1857 – Emanuel African Methodist Episcopal Church is built.
  - 1858 – City of Portsmouth incorporated as an independent city (separated from Norfolk County).
- 1860s
  - 1861
    - Civil War begins. Virginia joins the Confederate States of America.
    - Battle of Sewell's Point.
  - 1862
    - CSS Virginia is commissioned.
    - Battle of Hampton Roads
  - 1865 – Zion Baptist Church founded.
  - 1867 – Virginia Baptist State Convention organized during a meeting in Portsmouth.
- 1870s
  - 1870 – Population: 10,590.
- 1890s
  - 1890 – Became a stop on the Atlantic and Danville Railway.
  - 1894 – Annexation of portions of Norfolk County north of the city.
  - 1895 – The Portsmouth Truckers begin competing as a Minor League Baseball team.
  - 1896 – Norfolk and Portsmouth Belt Line Railroad begins.
  - 1897 – King's Daughters' Hospital Home for the Sick opens, which would later become known as Portsmouth General Hospital.
  - 1898 – Pythian Castle is built for the Atlantic Lodge, Knights of Pythias.

==== 20th century ====
- 1900s
  - 1900 – Lyceum Theatre in business.
  - 1905 St. Paul's Catholic Church is dedicated.
  - 1909 – Annexation of portions of Norfolk County West of the city.
- 1910s
  - 1910 – Population: 33,190.
  - 1914
    - World War I begins.
    - Portsmouth Public Library opens.
  - 1918
    - Cradock and Truxtun are developed by the United States Housing Corporation to meet the housing needs for the influx of workers at the Norfolk Naval Shipyard during World War I. Truxtun is the first wartime government housing project constructed exclusively for African-American residents.
    - World War I ends.
  - 1919 – Expansion via the annexation of parts of Norfolk County that included the port zone (Pinner's Point) along the Elizabeth River to the north and residential areas to the West.
- 1920s
  - 1921 – The Key Road School, the first school for Black children in the area, is founded by Julius Rosenwald and Booker T. Washington.
  - 1922 – Chevra Thilim Synagogue built.
- 1930s
  - 1939
    - Lyric Theatre in business.
    - World War II begins.
- 1940s
  - 1945
    - Portsmouth Public Community Library founded with Bertha Edwards as the founding librarian.
    - Glensheallah Hospital opens. It would later become Bon Secours Maryview Medical Center.
    - Commodore Theatre opens on High Street.
    - World War II ends.
  - 1947 – The Circle is built.
  - 1948 – The fourth annexation since becoming an independent city, pushing the city boundary westward to Western Branch.
  - 1949 – Portsmouth Naval Shipyard Museum established.
- 1950s
  - 1950 – Population: 80,039.
  - 1952 – Norfolk–Portsmouth Bridge–Tunnel, later known as the Downtown Tunnel, opens.
  - 1953
    - The first Portsmouth Invitational Tournament.
    - Temple Sinai is established in December.
  - 1955 – Portsmouth Historical Association founded.
  - 1957 – WAVY-TV begins broadcasting.
- 1960s
  - 1960
    - Portsmouth annexes additional portions of Norfolk County, including ten square miles and 36,000 residents.
    - Population: 114,773.
  - 1961 – Portsmouth-Norfolk Tides begin playing.
  - 1962 – Midtown Tunnel begins operating.
  - 1963 – Public Library's "Local History Room" established.
  - 1964 – United States lightship Portsmouth is donated to the city to become part of the Naval Shipyard Museum.
  - 1965 – The Key Road School closes.
  - 1966 – Virginia Sports Hall of Fame and Museum established.
  - 1968 – Further annexation of Norfolk County including ten square miles of land, 14 square miles of water area, and 11,000 residents, all within the northern one-third of Western Branch Borough. West Norfolk is part of the annexation.
- 1970s
  - 1970 – Portsmouth Public Schools is established by the Virginia General Assembly.
  - 1972 – Manor High School opens.
  - 1974 – Richard Joseph Davis becomes mayor.
- 1980s
  - 1980 – The Tidewater Children's Museum is established by volunteers from the Portsmouth Service League in the basement of the Portsmouth Library's main branch.
  - 1981
    - Portsmouth Times newspaper begins publication.
    - After serving as mayor for six years, Richard Joseph Davis is elected Lieutenant Governor of Virginia, becoming the first Catholic elected to a statewide office in Virginia history.
  - 1984
    - James W. Holley III becomes the first African-American mayor.
    - Louise Lucas becomes the first African-American woman to serve on the Portsmouth City Council.
    - Angelos Bible College opens.
    - The Tidewater Children's Museum moves to the old Norfolk County Courthouse building.
  - 1986 – Kenneth R. Melvin, from Portsmouth, is elected to represent the 80th District in the Virginia House of Delegates.
- 1990s
  - 1991 – Louise Lucas is elected to the Virginia General Assembly as a State Senator.
  - 1993 – Bobby Scott becomes U.S. representative for Virginia's 3rd congressional district.
  - 1994 – The Tidewater Children's Museum is renamed the Children's Museum of Virginia. The museum moves into a building on High Street.
  - 1998
    - Museum of Military History established.
    - Hampton Roads Regional Jail opens.
  - 1999 – Portsmouth General Hospital closes after more than 100 years of operation.

==== 21st century ====
- 2000s
  - 2000 – Population: 100,565
  - 2001 – Randy Forbes becomes U.S. representative for Virginia's 4th congressional district.
  - 2005 – The newly renovated Governor Dinwiddie Hotel reopens after being closed for more than ten years.
- 2010s
  - 2010 – Population: 95,535.
  - 2011 – Kirill Denyakin is shot and killed by police officer Stephen Rankin. Rankin is not indicted on charges.
  - 2013 – The Circle is demolished. It was officially removed from the National Register of Historic Places in 2017.
  - 2015 – William Chapman is the second person shot and killed by police officer Stephen Rankin. Rankin is ultimately convicted of manslaughter.
  - 2017 – John L. Rowe Jr. becomes mayor. The Sports Hall of Fame closes the Portsmouth location.
  - 2019 – Don Scott is elected from Portsmouth to represent the 80th District in the Virginia House of Delegates.
- 2020s
  - 2020
    - Population: 97,915.
    - Louise Lucas becomes the first woman and first African-American President pro tempore of the Senate of Virginia.
    - The Confederate Monument is vandalized during Black Lives Matter protests.
  - 2021 – Shannon Glover becomes mayor.
  - 2023
    - Rivers Casino Portsmouth, the first permanent Casino in Virginia History, opens in Portsmouth on Victory Blvd.
    - Don Scott is unanimously nominated by his caucus to become the first black Speaker of the Virginia House of Delegates.
  - 2024 – Hampton Roads Regional Jail permanently closes.

== Geography ==
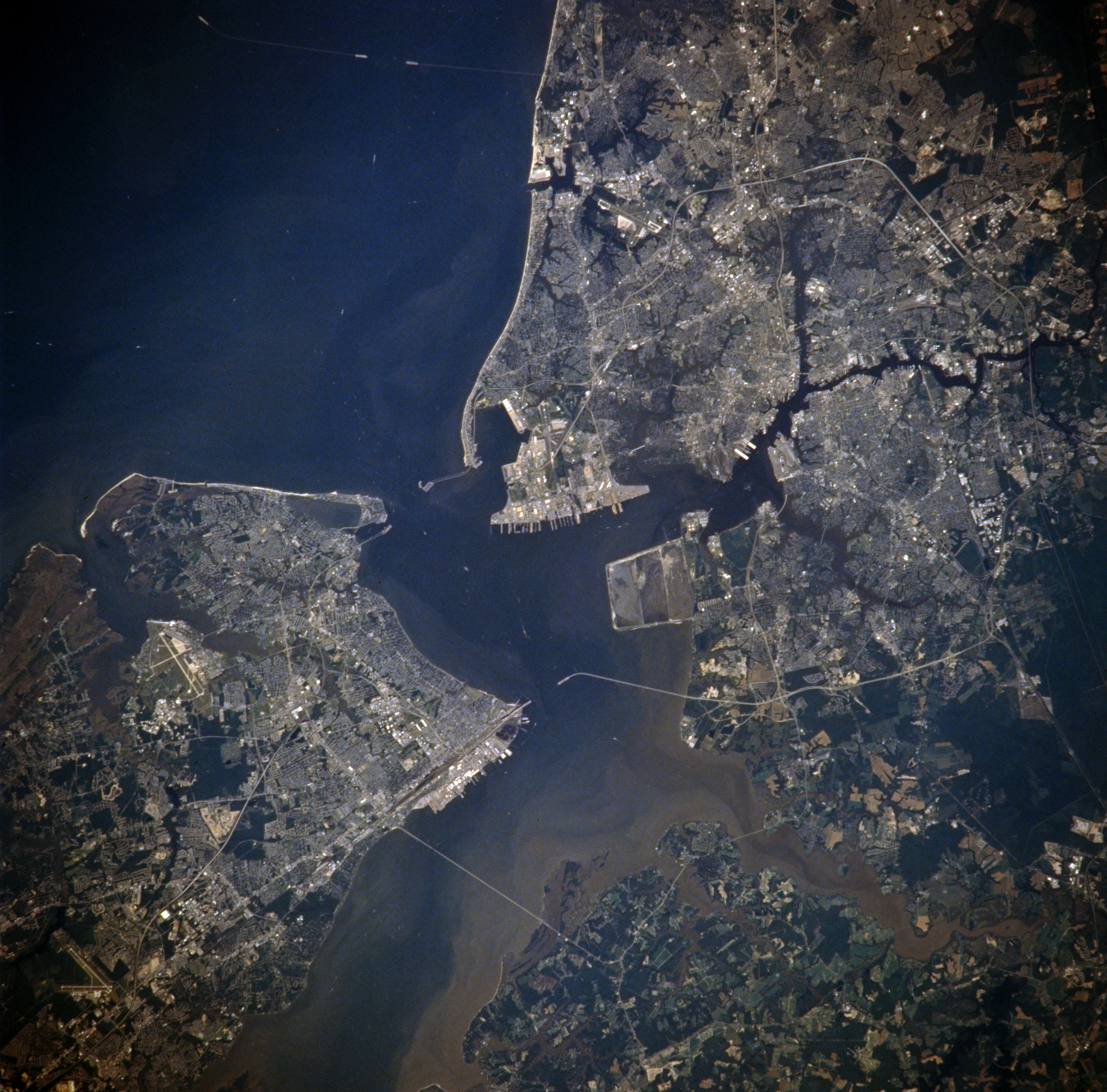
Newport News, Hampton, Portsmouth, and Norfolk, seen from space in July 1996. Portsmouth is in the center-right portion of the photo. North is at left.

According to the U.S. Census Bureau, Portsmouth has a total area of 46.68 square miles (120.9 km^{2}), of which 33.3 square miles (86 km^{2}) is land and 13.38 square miles (34.7 km^{2}) (28.7%) is water. The city is in the Hampton Roads region of Virginia, and is bisected by the West Branch of the Elizabeth River which flows from neighboring Suffolk. The region is known for its roadstead and low-lying coastal plains. The Hampton Roads region is the 37th-largest metropolitan area in the United States. Several creeks run through the city, including Scott Creek, Owens Creek, Paradise Creek, and Baines Creek, which are tributaries of the Elizabeth River.

The city borders Norfolk to the east, across the Elizabeth River. The river also runs along part of the city's southern border with Chesapeake. Portsmouth shares a border with Suffolk to the west. To the north, the city is bordered by water, where the James, Nansemond, and Elizabeth rivers come together. North of that part of the roadstead are the cities of Newport News and Hampton, which are connected to South Hampton Roads by the Monitor–Merrimac Memorial Bridge–Tunnel, which connects Newport News and Suffolk. The city is northeast of the Great Dismal Swamp, with the Dismal Swamp Canal nearly reaching Portsmouth. Porstmouth is also located 13 mi (21 km) west of Virginia Beach, 18 mi (29 km) north of the North Carolina border, 79 mi (127 km) southeast of Richmond, Virginia, and 148 mi (238 km) southeast of Washington, D.C.

=== Neighborhoods ===
Portsmouth has six historic districts: Cradock, Downtown, Olde Towne, Park View, Port Norfolk, and Truxtun. The historic districts were created to promote and preserve the cultural, education, and economic interests of the ciy. There is a historic rehabilitation tax credit available to citizens who work towards preserving and restoring homes in the neighborhoods.

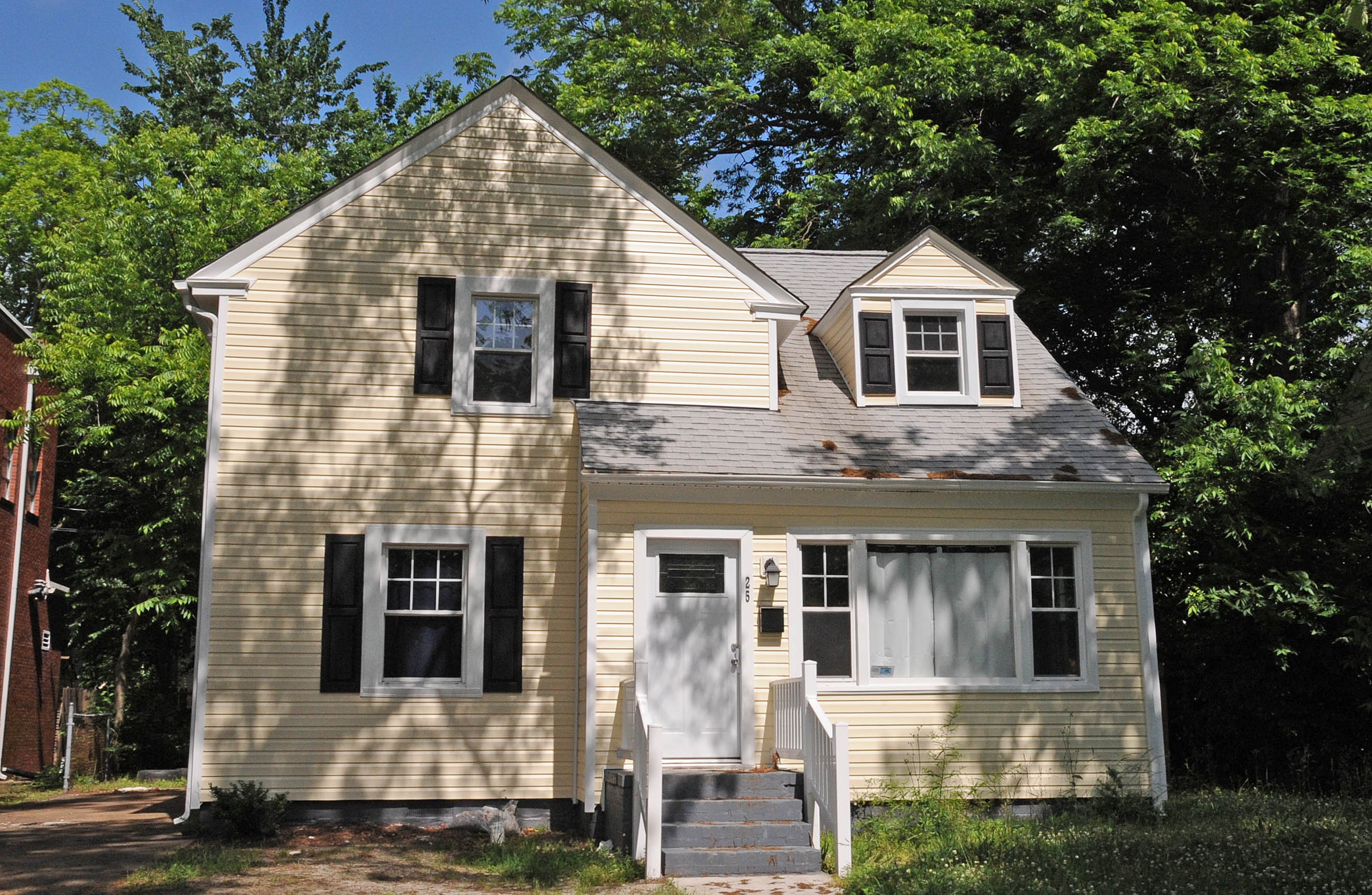
Cradock

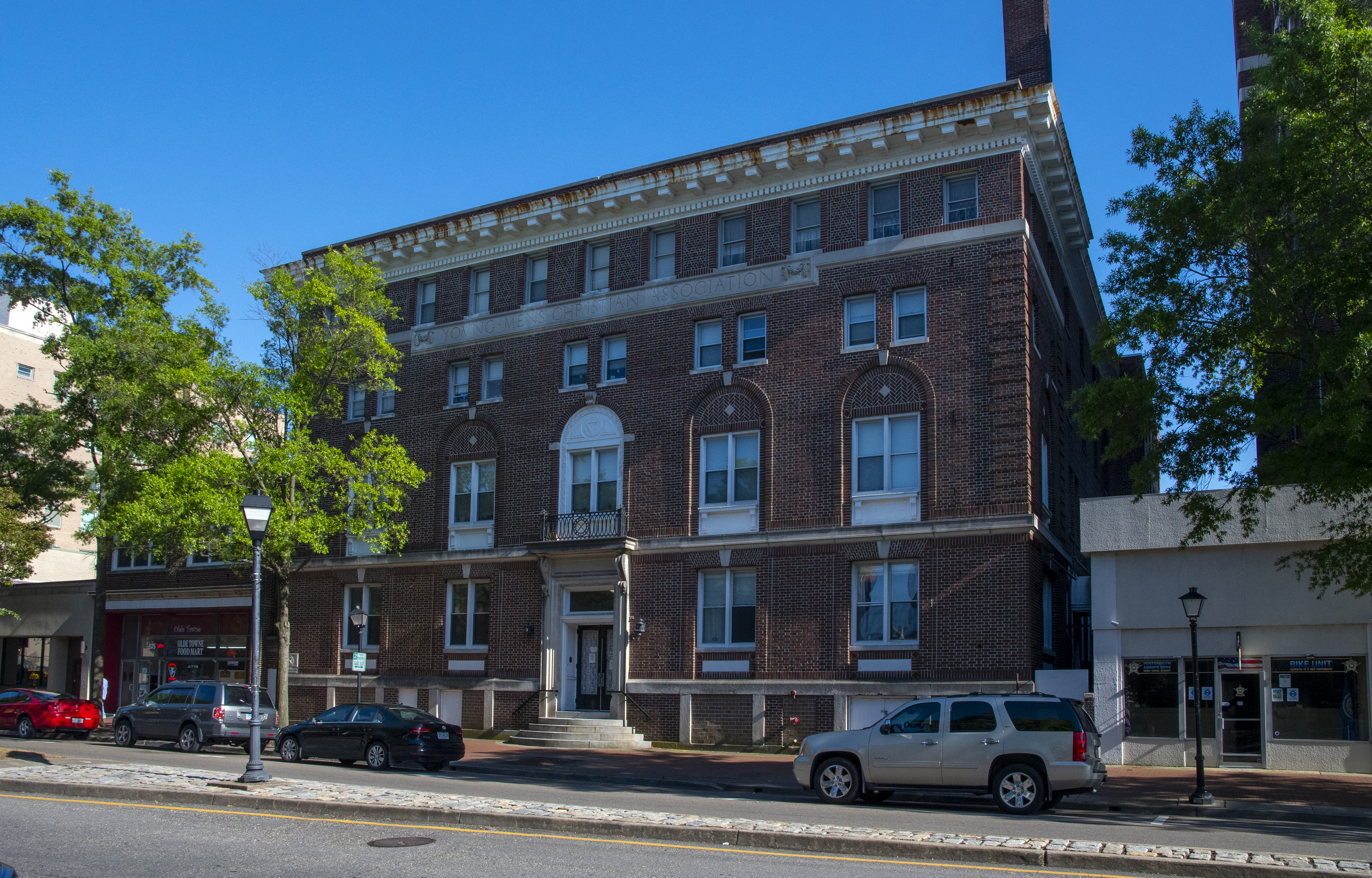
Downtown

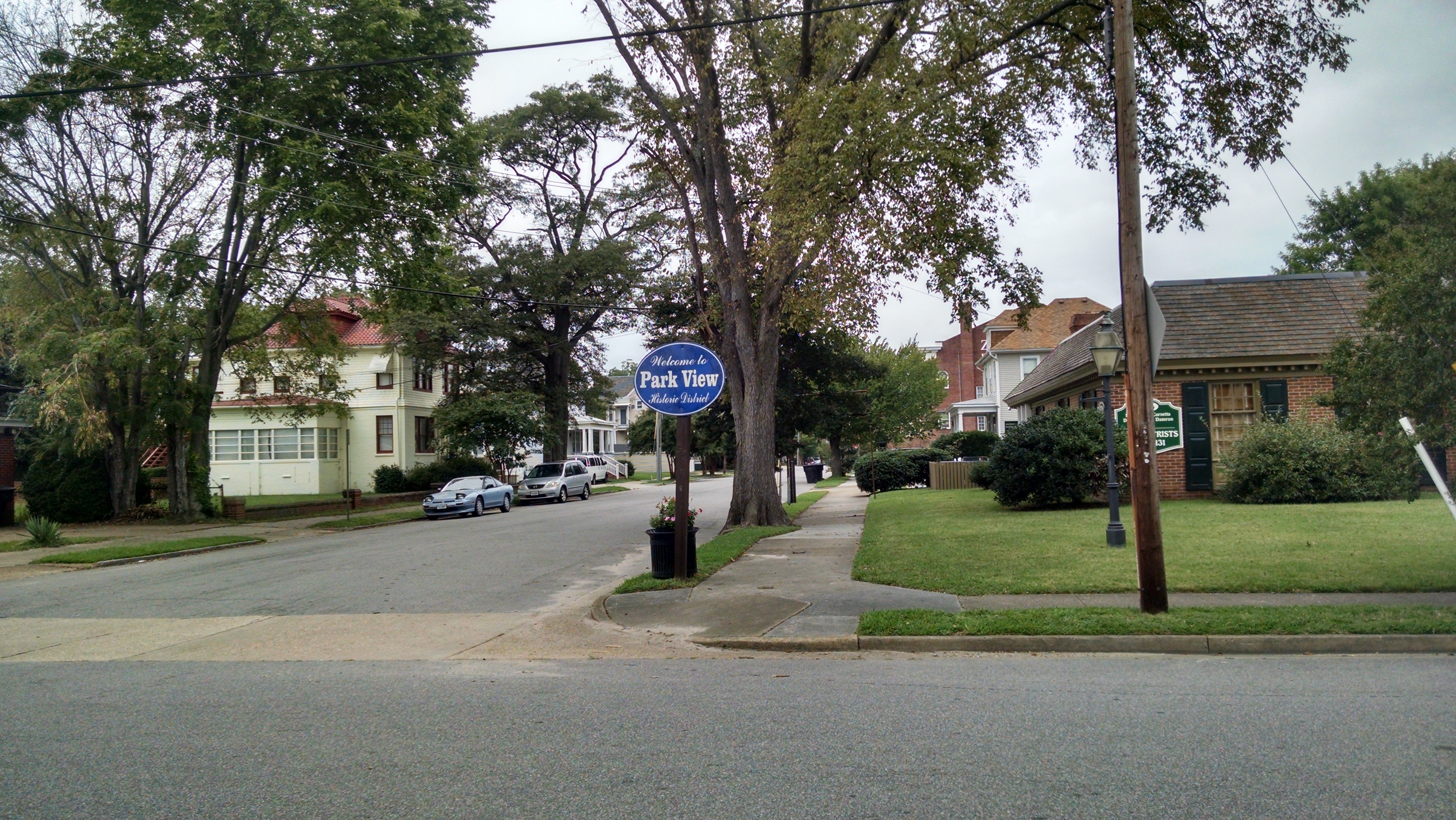
Park View

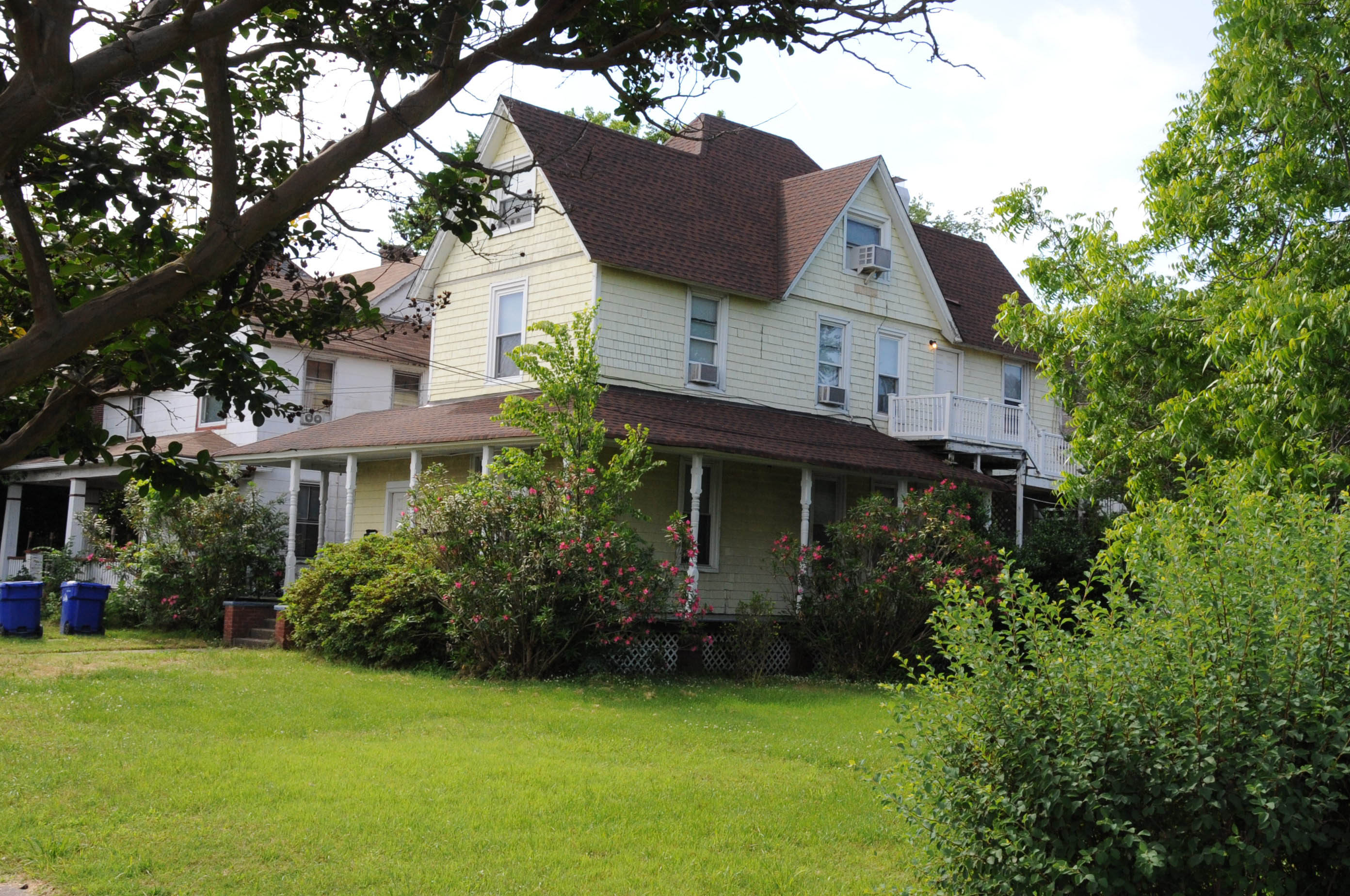
Port Norfolk

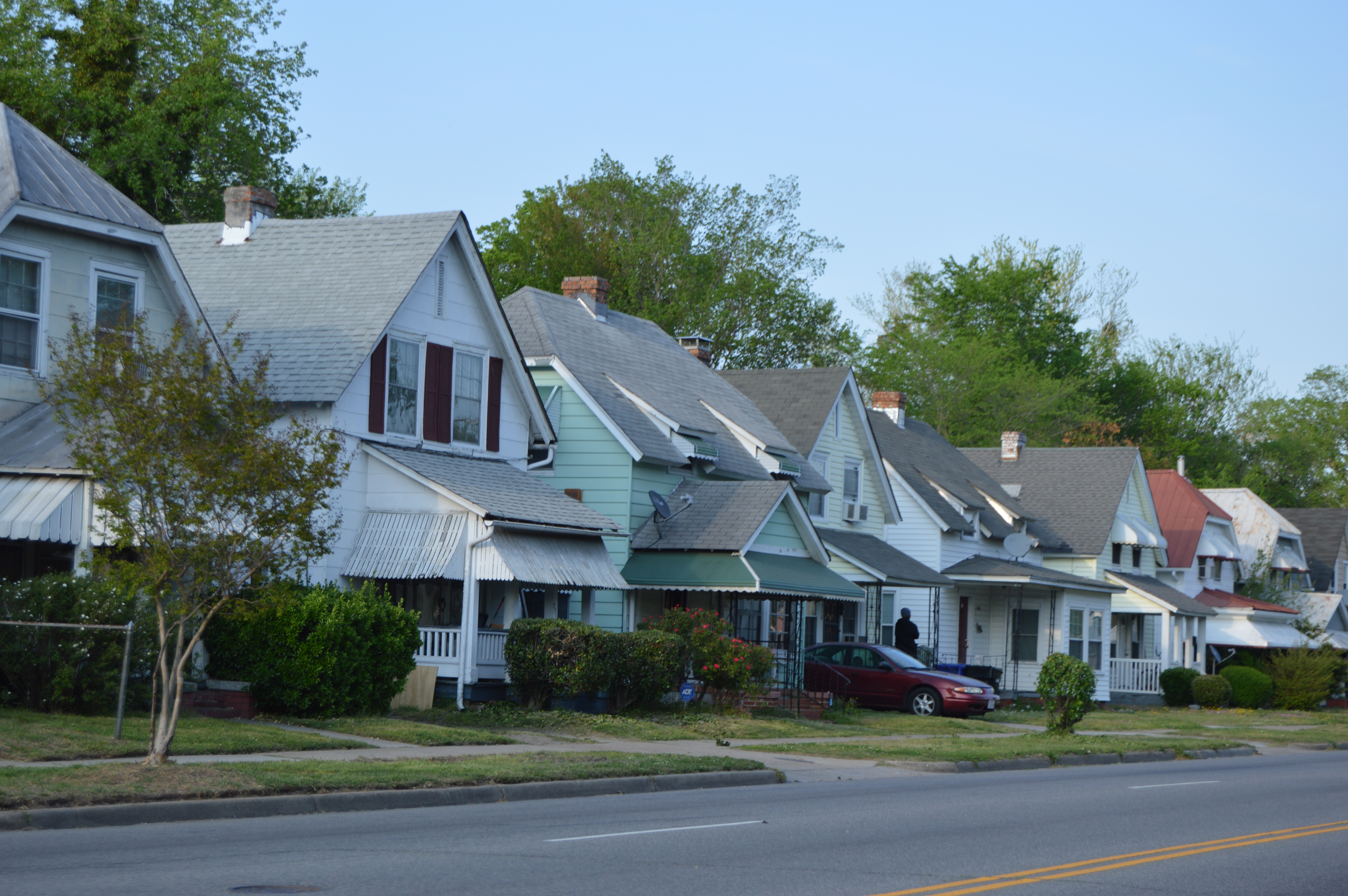
Truxtun

Cradock Historic District is a residential area that encompasses 759 buildings and 1 structure. Development of the neighborhood began in 1918, with plans for a community of Colonial Revival and Bungalow style single family residences. It was developed by the United States Housing Corporation as a result of the rapid influx of workers at the Norfolk Naval Shipyard during World War I. The district was listed on the National Register of Historic Places and the Virginia Landmarks Register in 1974.

The Downtown Historic District was added to the National Register of Historic Places in 2004. The area is bounded by Interstate 264, Middle Street, Primrose Street, and Queen Street. In contrast to the residential Olde Towne District, Downtown is a central business district. It is sometimes referred to as the High Street Corridor Historic District.

The Olde Towne Historic District is adjacent to the Downtown District, and features one of the largest collections of historically significant homes between Alexandria, Virginia and Charleston, South Carolina. The Emanuel African Methodist Episcopal Church was built by slaves and free men in 1857 and is the second-oldest building in Portsmouth and the city's oldest black church. The church was required by law to have a white minister, and did not have its first African-American pastor until Reverend James A. Handy took the position in 1864. In 1871, the congregation affiliated with the African Methodist Episcopal Church and became known as the Emanuel African Methodist Episcopal Church. The church was part of the Underground Railroad, used by freedom seekers to escape to the abolitionist Northern United States. In 2022, the church was officially recognized as part of the Civil War Trails Program and the National Park Service's Network to Freedom trail. Olde Towne contains a number of other historic buildings, as well, including the Pass House, which was built in 1841 by Judge James Murdaugh and occupied by Union troops from 1862 to 1865. Federal forces required Portsmouth residents to obtain a written pass to travel across the Elizabeth River and beyond. These passes were issued from the English basement and thus the name "Pass House" was derived.

Park View Historic District includes 295 buildings in a primarily residential section of northeast Portsmouth. The district was developed in the late-19th and early-20th centuries. Architecture in the neighborhood includes notable examples of Queen Anne, Colonial Revival, and American Foursquare style single family residences. Park View was added to the Virginia Landmarks Register and the National Register of Historic Places in 1984.

Port Norfolk Historic District was added to the Virginia Landmarks Register and the National Register of Historic Places in 1983. The historic neighborhood encompasses 621 buildings and 1 site and was developed between 1890 and 1910. Like Cradock and Park View, Port Norfolk is primarily a residential neighborhood. Architecture in the area includes notable examples of Queen Anne, Bungalow, American Craftsman, and American Foursquare style single family residences.

Truxtun Historic District encompasses 241 buildings. The district was added to the Virginia Landmarks Register in 1980 and was listed on the National Register of Historic Places in 1982. The neighborhood is primarily residential and was developed between 1918 and 1920 as a planned community of Colonial Revival style single family residences. Alongside Cradock, Truxtun was developed by the United States Housing Corporation as a result of the rapid influx of workers at the Norfolk Naval Shipyard during World War I; however, Truxtun was the first wartime government housing project constructed exclusively for African-American residents. In 1921 the Federal Government sold the neighborhood.

==== List of neighborhoods ====
- Academy Park
- Alexander Corner
- Armistead Forest
- Cavalier Manor
- Churchland
- Cradock Historic District
- Downtown
- Midtown
- Olde Towne Historic District
- Park Manor
- Park View Historic District
- Pinner Point
- Port Norfolk Historic District
- Prentiss Park
- Shea Terrace
- Swimming Point
- Truxtun Historic District
- West Norfolk
- West Park Homes
- West Park Manor
- Westhaven
- Westhaven Park
- Westmoreland
- Westwood
- Williams Court
- Windy Pines
- Woodbine

=== Climate ===
Portsmouth experiences a humid subtropical climate. Summers are hot and humid with warm evenings. The mean annual temperature is 61.6 °F (16.4 °C), with an average annual snowfall of 6 inches and an average annual rainfall of 47 inches. No measurable snow fell in 1999. The wettest seasons are the spring and summer, although rainfall is fairly constant all year round. The highest recorded temperature was 105.0 °F in 1980. The lowest recorded temperature was −3.0 °F on January 21, 1985.

Additionally, the geographic location of the city, with respect to the principal storm tracks, is especially favorable, as it is south of the average path of storms originating in the higher latitudes, and north of the usual tracks of hurricanes and other major tropical storms. Snow falls rarely, averaging 6.2 inches (160 mm) per season.

Climate data for Norfolk International Airport, Virginia (1991–2020 normals, (Note: Mean monthly maxima and minima (i.e. the expected highest and lowest temperature readings at any point during the year or given month) calculated based on data at said location from 1991 to 2020.) extremes 1874–present (Note: Official records for Norfolk kept January 1874 to December 1945 at the Weather Bureau Office in downtown, and at Norfolk Int'l since January 1946. For more information, see Threadex.))
Month	Jan	Feb	Mar	Apr	May	Jun	Jul	Aug	Sep	Oct	Nov	Dec	Year
Record high °F (°C)	84 (29)	82 (28)	92 (33)	97 (36)	100 (38)	102 (39)	105 (41)	105 (41)	100 (38)	95 (35)	86 (30)	82 (28)	105 (41)
Mean maximum °F (°C)	72.4 (22.4)	74.3 (23.5)	80.7 (27.1)	86.9 (30.5)	91.5 (33.1)	95.7 (35.4)	98.4 (36.9)	95.3 (35.2)	92.0 (33.3)	86.0 (30.0)	78.9 (26.1)	73.4 (23.0)	99.3 (37.4)
Mean daily maximum °F (°C)	50.7 (10.4)	53.4 (11.9)	60.1 (15.6)	70.0 (21.1)	77.4 (25.2)	85.2 (29.6)	89.4 (31.9)	86.9 (30.5)	81.4 (27.4)	72.3 (22.4)	62.1 (16.7)	54.7 (12.6)	70.3 (21.3)
Daily mean °F (°C)	42.2 (5.7)	44.2 (6.8)	50.7 (10.4)	60.1 (15.6)	68.3 (20.2)	76.7 (24.8)	81.1 (27.3)	79.2 (26.2)	74.0 (23.3)	63.7 (17.6)	53.3 (11.8)	46.1 (7.8)	61.6 (16.4)
Mean daily minimum °F (°C)	33.6 (0.9)	35.1 (1.7)	41.3 (5.2)	50.1 (10.1)	59.1 (15.1)	68.1 (20.1)	72.8 (22.7)	71.6 (22.0)	66.6 (19.2)	55.1 (12.8)	44.4 (6.9)	37.6 (3.1)	52.9 (11.6)
Mean minimum °F (°C)	18.7 (−7.4)	21.6 (−5.8)	27.4 (−2.6)	37.0 (2.8)	46.9 (8.3)	56.0 (13.3)	64.7 (18.2)	63.7 (17.6)	55.5 (13.1)	40.4 (4.7)	29.8 (−1.2)	23.9 (−4.5)	16.8 (−8.4)
Record low °F (°C)	−3 (−19)	2 (−17)	14 (−10)	23 (−5)	36 (2)	45 (7)	54 (12)	49 (9)	40 (4)	27 (−3)	17 (−8)	5 (−15)	−3 (−19)
Average precipitation inches (mm)	3.41 (87)	2.90 (74)	3.69 (94)	3.37 (86)	3.78 (96)	4.43 (113)	6.08 (154)	5.88 (149)	5.40 (137)	3.86 (98)	3.10 (79)	3.28 (83)	49.18 (1,249)
Average snowfall inches (cm)	3.2 (8.1)	1.5 (3.8)	0.4 (1.0)	0.0 (0.0)	0.0 (0.0)	0.0 (0.0)	0.0 (0.0)	0.0 (0.0)	0.0 (0.0)	0.0 (0.0)	0.0 (0.0)	1.1 (2.8)	6.2 (16)
Average precipitation days (≥ 0.01 in)	10.7	9.2	10.9	10.0	11.2	9.7	10.6	10.2	9.4	7.7	8.9	9.9	118.4
Average snowy days (≥ 0.1 in)	1.7	1.3	0.5	0.0	0.0	0.0	0.0	0.0	0.0	0.0	0.0	0.5	4.0
Average relative humidity (%)	66.3	65.6	64.6	62.8	68.8	70.6	73.3	75.2	74.4	72.1	68.5	67.0	69.1
Average dew point °F (°C)	27.9 (−2.3)	28.9 (−1.7)	35.8 (2.1)	43.2 (6.2)	54.5 (12.5)	63.1 (17.3)	68.2 (20.1)	68.0 (20.0)	62.4 (16.9)	51.3 (10.7)	41.7 (5.4)	32.7 (0.4)	48.1 (9.0)
Mean monthly sunshine hours	171.5	175.2	229.3	252.8	271.7	280.1	278.3	260.4	231.4	208.3	175.7	160.4	2,695.1
Percentage possible sunshine	56	58	62	64	62	64	62	62	62	60	57	53	61
Average ultraviolet index	2	4	5	7	8	10	9	9	7	5	3	2	6
Source 1: NOAA (relative humidity and sun 1961–1990)
Source 2: Weather Atlas (UV)

== Demographics ==
Historical population
Census	Pop.	Note	%±
1840	6,477		—
1850	8,626		33.2%
1860	9,496		10.1%
1870	10,590		11.5%
1880	11,390		7.6%
1890	13,268		16.5%
1900	17,427		31.3%
1910	33,190		90.5%
1920	54,387		63.9%
1930	45,704		−16.0%
1940	50,745		11.0%
1950	80,039		57.7%
1960	114,773		43.4%
1970	110,963		−3.3%
1980	104,577		−5.8%
1990	103,910		−0.6%
2000	100,565		−3.2%
2010	95,535		−5.0%
2020	97,915		2.5%
2025 (est.)	96,777	▼	−1.2%
U.S. Decennial Census; 1790–1960 1900–1990; 1990–2000 2010–2013

=== Racial and ethnic composition ===
Portsmouth city, Virginia – Racial and ethnic composition Note: the US Census treats Hispanic/Latino as an ethnic category. This table excludes Latinos from the racial categories and assigns them to a separate category. Hispanics/Latinos may be of any race.
Race / Ethnicity (NH = Non-Hispanic)	Pop 1980	Pop 1990	Pop 2000	Pop 2010	Pop 2020	% 1980	% 1990	% 2000	% 2010	% 2020
White alone (NH)	55,764	52,579	45,403	38,526	34,912	53.32%	50.60%	45.15%	40.33%	35.66%
Black or African American alone (NH)	46,842	48,876	50,569	50,327	51,586	44.79%	47.04%	50.28%	52.68%	52.68%
Native American or Alaska Native alone (NH)	173	286	449	379	355	0.17%	0.28%	0.45%	0.40%	0.36%
Asian alone (NH)	718	760	762	994	1,244	0.69%	0.73%	0.76%	1.04%	1.27%
Native Hawaiian or Pacific Islander alone (NH)	x	x	60	104	134	x	x	0.06%	0.11%	0.14%
Other race alone (NH)	38	42	113	118	490	0.04%	0.04%	0.11%	0.12%	0.50%
Mixed race or Multiracial (NH)	x	x	1,461	2,168	4,781	x	x	1.45%	2.27%	4.88%
Hispanic or Latino (any race)	1,042	1,364	1,748	2,919	4,413	1.00%	1.31%	1.74%	3.06%	4.51%
Total	104,577	103,907	100,565	95,535	97,915	100.00%	100.00%	100.00%	100.00%	100.00%

=== 2020 census ===
As of the 2020 census, Portsmouth had a population of 97,915, up from 95,535 in 2010 and the first decennial increase since 1960. The gender makeup was about 52% female, with 93.4 males for every 100 females and 90.7 males for every 100 females age 18 and over; the median age was 37.0 years, with 22.2% under the age of 18 and 15.8% 65 years of age or older, and 8,612 veterans made up roughly 8.7% of the population.

The census reported the city as 53.3% Black or African American (52,214 people), 36.7% White (35,892), 6.4% two or more races (6,218), 1.3% Asian (1,285), 0.4% American Indian and Alaska Native (427), 0.1% Native Hawaiian or Pacific Islander (141), and 1.8% some other race (1,738); approximately 4.5% were Hispanic or Latino of any race (4,413).

There were 39,547 households, of which 29.5% had children under the age of 18, 34.0% were married-couple households, 21.7% were male householders with no spouse or partner present, 37.2% were female householders with no spouse or partner present, 31.4% were households made up of individuals, and 11.5% had someone living alone who was 65 years of age or older.

According to the 2020 census's demographic and housing characteristics, 100.0% of residents lived in urban areas while 0.0% lived in rural areas. The city had 43,164 housing units, of which 8.4% were vacant, with a homeowner vacancy rate of 2.7% and a rental vacancy rate of 7.6%.

=== 2010 census ===
Age distribution in Portsmouth in 2010

As of the 2010 census, there were 95,535 people, 38,170 households, and 25,497 families residing in the city. The population density was 3,032.7 inhabitants per square mile (1,170.9/km^{2}). There were 41,605 housing units at an average density of 1,254.7 units per square mile (484.4 units/km^{2}). The racial makeup of the city was 53.3% African American, 41.6% White, 0.4% Native American, 1.1% Asian, 0.1% Pacific Islander, 1.0% from other races, and 2.6% from two or more races. Hispanic or Latino of any race were 3.1% of the population.

There were 38,170 households, out of which 30.6% had children under the age of 18 living with them, 41.1% were married couples living together, 10.9% have a female household with no husband present and 33.2% were non-families. 27.5% of all households were made up of individuals, and 10.8% had someone living alone who was 65 years of age or older. The average household size was 2.51 and the average family size was 3.05.

In the city, the population was spread out, with 25.7% under the age of 18, 11.1% from 18 to 24, 29.1% from 25 to 44, 20.3% from 45 to 64, and 13.8% who were 65 years of age or older. The median age was 34 years. For every 100 females, there were 93.5 males. For every 100 females age 18 and over, there were 90.6 males.

The median income for a household in the city was $46,340, and the median income for a family was $53,769. Males had a median income of $39,871 versus $33,140 for females. The per capita income for the city was $23,108. About 13.5% of families and 16.7% of the population were below the poverty line, including 27.1% of those under age 18 and 10.8% of those age 65 or over.

== Arts and culture ==
=== Tourism ===
Portsmouth has a long history as a port town and city. The Olde Towne Business and Historic District is located adjacent to the Downtown Portsmouth Historic District, where a combination of preservation and redevelopment has been underway. The Hawthorn Hotel & Suites at The Governor Dinwiddie Hotel was renovated and reopened in 2005 after being closed for more than 10 years. It has been recognized by Historic Hotels of America, a program of the National Trust for Historic Preservation that identifies hotels that have maintained their historical integrity, architecture and ambiance and provides resources for their preservation. The historic hotel was named for Governor Robert Dinwiddie, who was the administrative head of the Colony of Virginia during the time Portsmouth was founded in 1752. It was largely through his efforts that Virginia survived the French and Indian War relatively well.

Other points of interest include the Portsmouth City Park, featuring the 2 ft (610 mm) narrow-gauge Portsmouth City Railroad with an operating Chance Rides C.P. Huntington locomotive named Pokey Smokey II. The original Pokey Smokey locomotive was built by Crown Metal Products and ran at the park for many years before being sold at auction. It now runs on the Mideast Railroad in Ederville in Carthage, North Carolina.

The Railroad Museum of Virginia located at Harbor Center Way features vintage railroad artifacts, rolling stock, and an operating model train layout.

The Children's Museum of Virginia is located in Portsmouth at 221 High Street. It is the largest children's museum in the state. The museum is busiest in the summer, receiving up to 1,000 visitors per day.

Completed in 2023, the Rivers Casino Portsmouth boasts a 50,000-square-foot (4,600 m^{2}) casino floor with slots, table games, poker tables, and a sportsbook. It is the second casino in Virginia and the first casino in Virginia with a permanent facility.

=== Historic sites ===
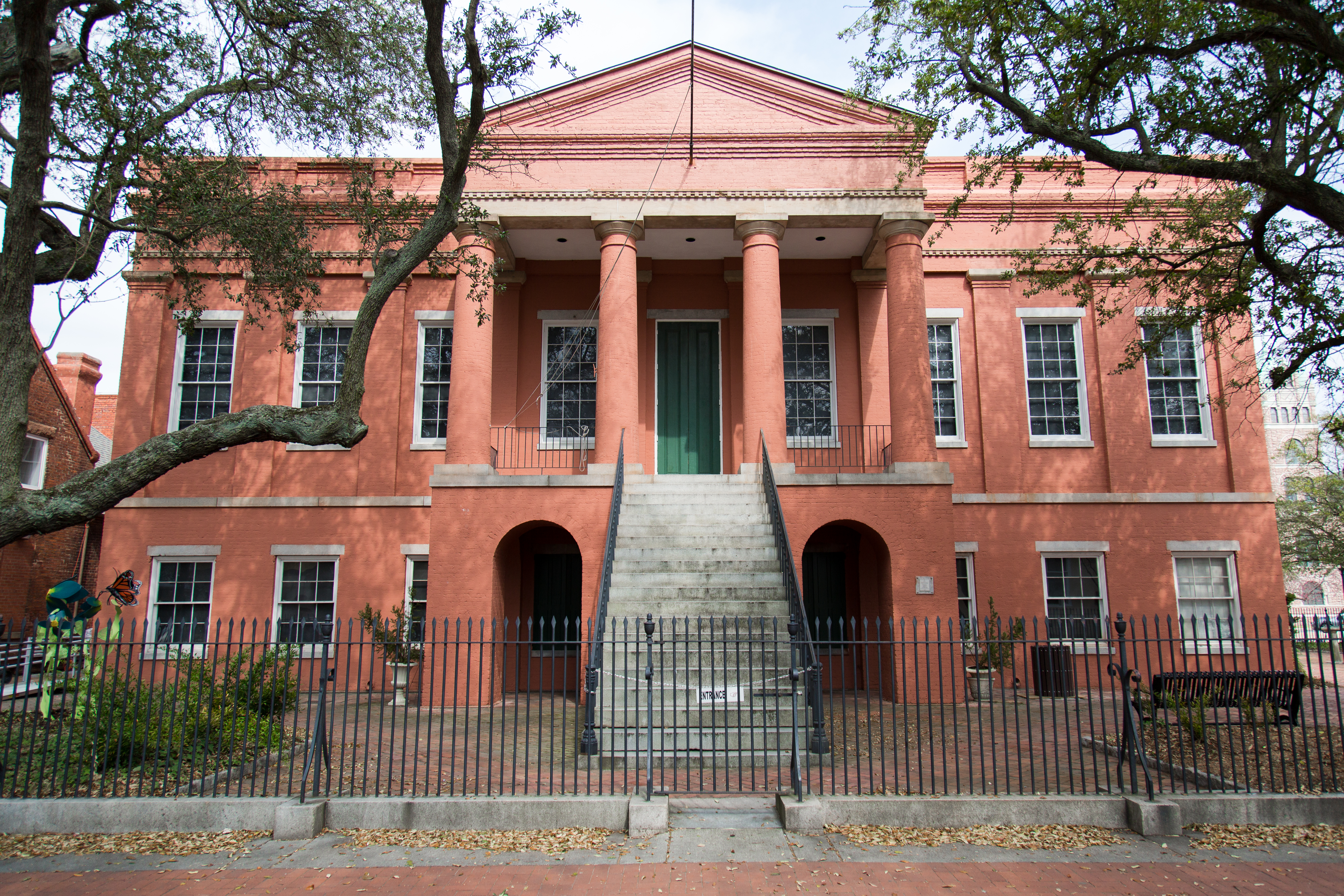
Built in 1846, the Portsmouth Courthouse is a historic landmark in the center of the Olde Towne Historic District.

==== Seaboard Coastline Building ====
Located at 1 High Street in the Olde Towne Historic District, the Seaboard Coastline Building is a historic train station and former headquarters of the Seaboard Air Line railroad company.

==== Hill House ====
Hill House is a four-story 1825 English basement home furnished entirely with original family belongings. The Hill family were avid collectors and lived graciously over a period of 150 years. The house remains in its original condition, with limited renovation through the years.

==== Cedar Grove Cemetery ====
Established in 1832, Cedar Grove Cemetery is the oldest city-owned cemetery in Portsmouth. Listed on the National Register of Historic Places listings in Portsmouth, Virginia, the cemetery is noted for its funerary art and the civic, business, maritime, religious and military leaders who are buried there. Historical markers placed throughout the cemetery allow for self-guided tours. The cemetery is located between Effingham Street and Fort Lane in Olde Towne Portsmouth. Entrance is through the south gate to the cemetery, located on London Boulevard.

== Sports ==
In 1895, Portsmouth became home to the Portsmouth Truckers, a minor league professional baseball team. The team played in the Virginia State League. In 1896, the team was renamed the Portsmouth Browns and competed in the Virginia League. In 1900, the team competed in the Virginia League as the Portsmouth Boers. They again competed as the Browns in 1901 in the Virginia-North Carolina League. From 1906 to 1909, the team played once again as the Portsmouth Truckers. In 1911, they competed in the Tidewater League. From 1912 to 1935, the team played in the Virginia League. They were the Portsmouth Pirates in 1912 and 1913, but returned to the mascot Truckers in 1914. In 1920, under managers Jim Barton and Jim Viox, the team won the first of multiple league championships. They won their next title the next season, also under Viox's guidance. They won their third and final league championship in 1927, under the leadership of Zinn Beck. In 1935, they were affiliated with the Chicago Cubs and began competing in the Piedmont League. Because of the affiliation, they began competing as the Portsmouth Cubs in 1936. The team was affiliated with the Philadelphia Phillies from 1939 to 1940, but was again affiliated with the Cubs from 1941 to 1947. From 1953 until 1955 the team was known as the Portsmouth Merrimacs.

Portsmouth hosted the Portsmouth-Norfolk Tides from 1961 to 1968, who played in the Class A level South Atlantic League from 1961 to 1962 and the Class A Carolina League from 1963 to 1968. The franchise played its last season in Portsmouth when the Jacksonville Suns of the Class AAA level International League moved there in 1969. In 1970, the franchise relocated permanently to Norfolk, becoming the Tidewater Tides of the International League from 1969 to 1992. That team later evolved into today's Class AAA Norfolk Tides.

Each April since 1953, the city hosts the Portsmouth Invitational Tournament, where college basketball seniors play in front of scouts from the NBA and top European leagues. Many top basketball stars played in the PIT before successful pro careers, including Jimmy Butler, Scottie Pippen, Dennis Rodman, and John Stockton.

The Portsmouth Cavaliers were a basketball team founded in 2010 and played in the American Basketball Association for the 2011–12 season. Based in Portsmouth, Virginia, the Cavaliers played their home games at the Chick-fil-A Fieldhouse on the campus of Portsmouth Catholic Regional School. The club spent one season in the American Professional Basketball League (APBL) before folding.

== Government ==
Portsmouth is one of the most consistently Democratic of all Virginia's cities and counties. It has only voted for a Republican twice since 1900 (in 1928 and 1972), both of which were national landslides. It has voted for the Democratic candidate by over 60% since 1996, and in 2012 Barack Obama reached 70% of the vote for the first time since 1948.

United States presidential election results for Portsmouth, Virginia
Year	Republican		Democratic		Third party(ies)	
Year	No.	%	No.	%	No.	%
1880	1,024	44.64%	1,270	55.36%	0	0.00%
1884	1,344	50.60%	1,312	49.40%	0	0.00%
1888	1,107	43.07%	1,439	55.99%	24	0.93%
1892	1,052	37.41%	1,728	61.45%	32	1.14%
1896	769	34.89%	1,380	62.61%	55	2.50%
1900	566	24.27%	1,743	74.74%	23	0.99%
1904	247	17.31%	1,151	80.66%	29	2.03%
1908	407	25.92%	1,154	73.50%	9	0.57%
1912	64	3.31%	1,529	79.02%	342	17.67%
1916	376	20.76%	1,368	75.54%	67	3.70%
1920	1,061	24.40%	3,228	74.24%	59	1.36%
1924	604	17.70%	2,206	64.64%	603	17.67%
1928	3,474	57.32%	2,587	42.68%	0	0.00%
1932	1,840	34.76%	3,344	63.17%	110	2.08%
1936	861	13.23%	5,617	86.30%	31	0.48%
1940	675	11.73%	5,053	87.83%	25	0.43%
1944	1,129	16.42%	5,735	83.39%	13	0.19%
1948	2,056	27.86%	4,612	62.48%	713	9.66%
1952	3,621	36.74%	6,188	62.79%	46	0.47%
1956	5,390	47.13%	5,683	49.69%	363	3.17%
1960	6,900	40.64%	9,902	58.32%	178	1.05%
1964	8,420	34.31%	16,073	65.49%	51	0.21%
1968	9,402	25.15%	15,734	42.09%	12,245	32.76%
1972	20,090	58.49%	13,124	38.21%	1,136	3.31%
1976	12,872	35.51%	22,837	63.01%	537	1.48%
1980	13,660	38.00%	20,900	58.14%	1,389	3.86%
1984	18,940	46.42%	21,623	53.00%	238	0.58%
1988	16,087	44.61%	19,698	54.63%	274	0.76%
1992	12,575	33.45%	20,416	54.30%	4,608	12.26%
1996	10,686	30.18%	22,150	62.55%	2,573	7.27%
2000	12,628	35.62%	22,286	62.86%	541	1.53%
2004	15,212	38.48%	24,112	60.99%	210	0.53%
2008	13,984	29.97%	32,327	69.27%	354	0.76%
2012	12,858	28.00%	32,501	70.77%	563	1.23%
2016	12,795	29.57%	28,497	65.87%	1,973	4.56%
2020	12,755	28.61%	30,948	69.42%	879	1.97%
2024	12,370	29.91%	28,306	68.45%	677	1.64%

Portsmouth is governed under the Council-Manager form of government. The current mayor is Navy veteran and businessman Shannon Glover. In 2024, Glover was re-elected for a second four-year term. The City Council is a legislative body served by six members, elected for four-year terms.

List of mayors of Portsmouth, Virginia
- John S. White, 1852–1853
- Hezekiah Stoakes, 1854
- D. D. Fiske, 1855
- James G. Hodges, 1856–1857
- George W. Grice, 1858–1860
- John O. Lawrence, 1861
- John Nash, 1862
- Daniel Collins, 1863–1865
- James C. White, 1866
- James E. Stoakes, 1868
- E. W. Whipple, 1869
- Philip G. Thomas, 1870–1871
- A. S. Watts, 1872–1874
- John O'Connor, 1876–1877
- John Thompson Baird, 1878–1894
- L.H. Davis, 1894–1896
- John Thompson Baird, circa 1896–1902
- ?
- Jack P. Barnes, circa 1973
- Richard Joseph Davis, 1974–1980
- Julian E. Johansen, circa 1980–1983
- James W. Holley III, 1984–1987
- Gloria Webb, 1987–1996
- James W. Holley III, 1996–2010
- Kenneth I. Wright, 2010–2017
- John Rowe, 2017–2021
- Shannon Glover 2021–present

== Education ==
=== Primary and secondary schools ===
In 1846, the Virginia General Assembly passed an act that established a "free education for all classes." In 1848, Portsmouth began organizing a public education system for primary school and elected a board for that purpose. A small tuition was required, but poorer students were paid for by funds from the sale of the Glebe lands. During the 1969-1970 session of the General Assembly, Portsmouth Public Schools was established. The district is made up of twenty-four schools. There are three public high schools in Portsmouth, located at three corners of the city. In the northwest section of the city, off Cedar Lane, is Churchland High School. In the downtown section of the city, between London Blvd and High Street, is I.C. Norcom High School. In the southwest section of Portsmouth, on Elmhurst Lane, is Manor High School. There are also three middle schools, thirteen elementary schools, three preschools, an alternative education center, and an adult education center. There are approximately 13,000 students enrolled in Portsmouth Public Schools, and the district employs approximately 2,100 people. The district has struggled with staff retention and teacher vacancies.

In 2023, the superintendent of Portsmouth Public Schools announced the development of a Career and Technical Education Center. In July 2024, the city began construction on the center, named the Portsmouth Advanced Career Education (PACE) Center.

=== Higher education ===
Portsmouth is home to the Tri-Cities Higher Education Center of Old Dominion University (ODU), a public research university founded in 1930 whose main campus is located in Norfolk, Virginia. Portsmouth is also home to the Fred W. Beazley Portsmouth Campus of Tidewater Community College, a two-year higher education institution founded in 1968 in South Hampton Roads with additional campuses located in Chesapeake, Norfolk, and Virginia Beach. Angelos Bible College was established in 1984, under the name Angelos Bible Institute. In August 2000, the school received approval from the State Council of Higher Education of Virginia to begin offering degrees, and the first class graduated in 2001.

== Media ==
Portsmouth's daily newspaper is the Virginian-Pilot with The Currents being the Portsmouth edition of the Sunday paper. Other papers include the New Journal and Guide, and Inside Business. Hampton Roads Magazine serves as a bi-monthly regional magazine for Portsmouth and the Hampton Roads area. The Hampton Roads Times is an online magazine for all the Hampton Roads cities and counties. Portsmouth is served by a variety of radio stations on the AM and FM dials, with towers located around the Hampton Roads area.

The major network television affiliates are WTKR-TV 3 (CBS), WAVY 10 (NBC), WVEC-TV 13 (ABC), WGNT 27 (Independent), WTVZ 33 (MyNetworkTV), WVBT 43 (Fox, with The CW on DT2), and WPXV 49 (ION Television). The Public Broadcasting Service stations are WHRO-TV 15, Hampton/Norfolk and WUND-TV 2, Edenton, NC. Two additional stations also receivable in Portsmouth include independent station WSKY-TV, which broadcasts on channel 4 from the Outer Banks of North Carolina and WGBS-LD broadcasting paid programming on channel 7 from Carrollton. Portsmouth is served by Cox Cable and Verizon FIOS. DirecTV and Dish Network are also popular as an alternative to cable television in Portsmouth. The Hampton Roads designated market area (DMA) is the 42nd largest in the U.S. with 712,790 homes (0.64% of the total U.S.).

== Infrastructure ==
=== Transportation ===
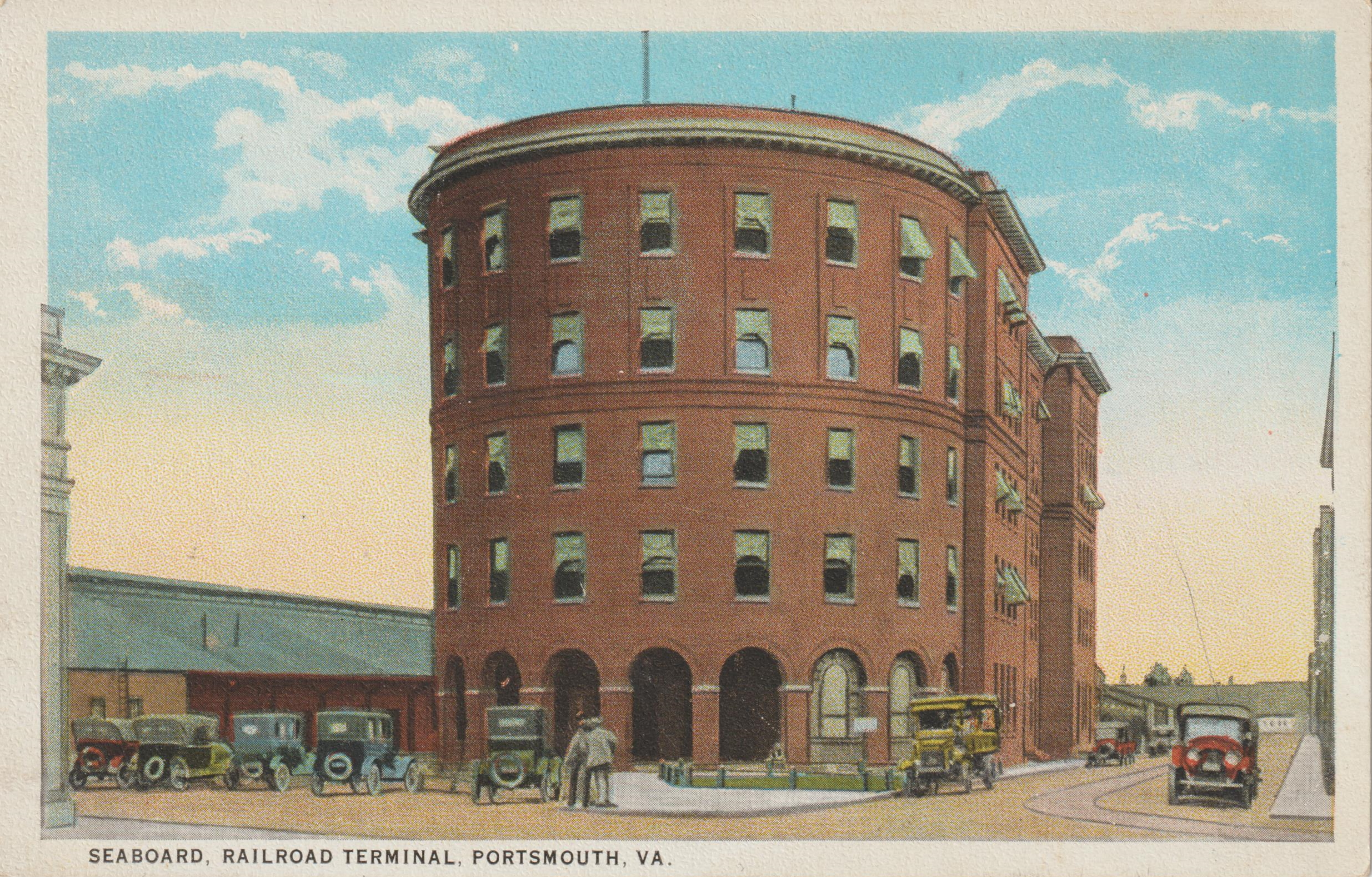
Seaboard Terminal, which served passenger trains until 1968

From the earliest development, Portsmouth has been oriented to the water. In the 1830s, it was the first community in Hampton Roads to receive a new land transportation innovation, railroad service. The Portsmouth and Roanoke Railroad, a predecessor of the Seaboard Air Line Railroad, extended to the rapids of the Roanoke River on its fall line near Weldon, North Carolina. It was to be 20 more years before its bigger neighbor, the city of Norfolk, also received a rail line, in 1858, when the Norfolk and Petersburg Railroad was completed. The Atlantic Coast Line Railroad operated passenger trains #36 and #5 to and from its North Portsmouth Station to Rocky Mount, North Carolina until 1954. In earlier years ACL ran trains including the Tar Heel all the way south to Wilmington, North Carolina.

From Seaboard Terminal the Seaboard Air Line and then the Seaboard Coast Line Railroad operated #17 and #18 to and from Raleigh, North Carolina, where the train joined with those companies' Silver Comet. The SAL also operated a local all-coach train (#3-11 southbound/#6-10 northbound) to Atlanta from the terminal. The 17/18 trains ended in 1968.

Portsmouth is primarily served by the Norfolk International Airport (IATA: ORF, ICAO: KORF, FAA LID: ORF), now the region's major commercial airport. The airport is located near Chesapeake Bay, along the city limits of neighboring Norfolk and Virginia Beach. Seven airlines provide nonstop services to twenty-five destinations. ORF had 3,703,664 passengers take off or land at its facility and 68,778,934 pounds of cargo were processed through its facilities. Newport News/Williamsburg International Airport (IATA: PHF, ICAO: KPHF, FAA LID: PHF) also provides commercial air service for the Hampton Roads area. The Chesapeake Regional Airport provides general aviation services and is located five miles (8.0 km) outside the city limits.

In the 21st century, the city has access to lines of CSX Transportation, Norfolk Southern and three short line railroads. Amtrak provides service to points along the Northeast Corridor from Newport News station across the Hampton Roads, and from Norfolk station across the Elizabeth River.

Portsmouth is served by Interstate 264 and Interstate 664, which is part of the Hampton Roads Beltway. U.S. Route 17 and U.S. Route 58 pass through. The Elizabeth River is crossed via the Midtown Tunnel, the Downtown Tunnel and Berkley Bridge combination.

Hampton Roads Transit is the regional bus service.

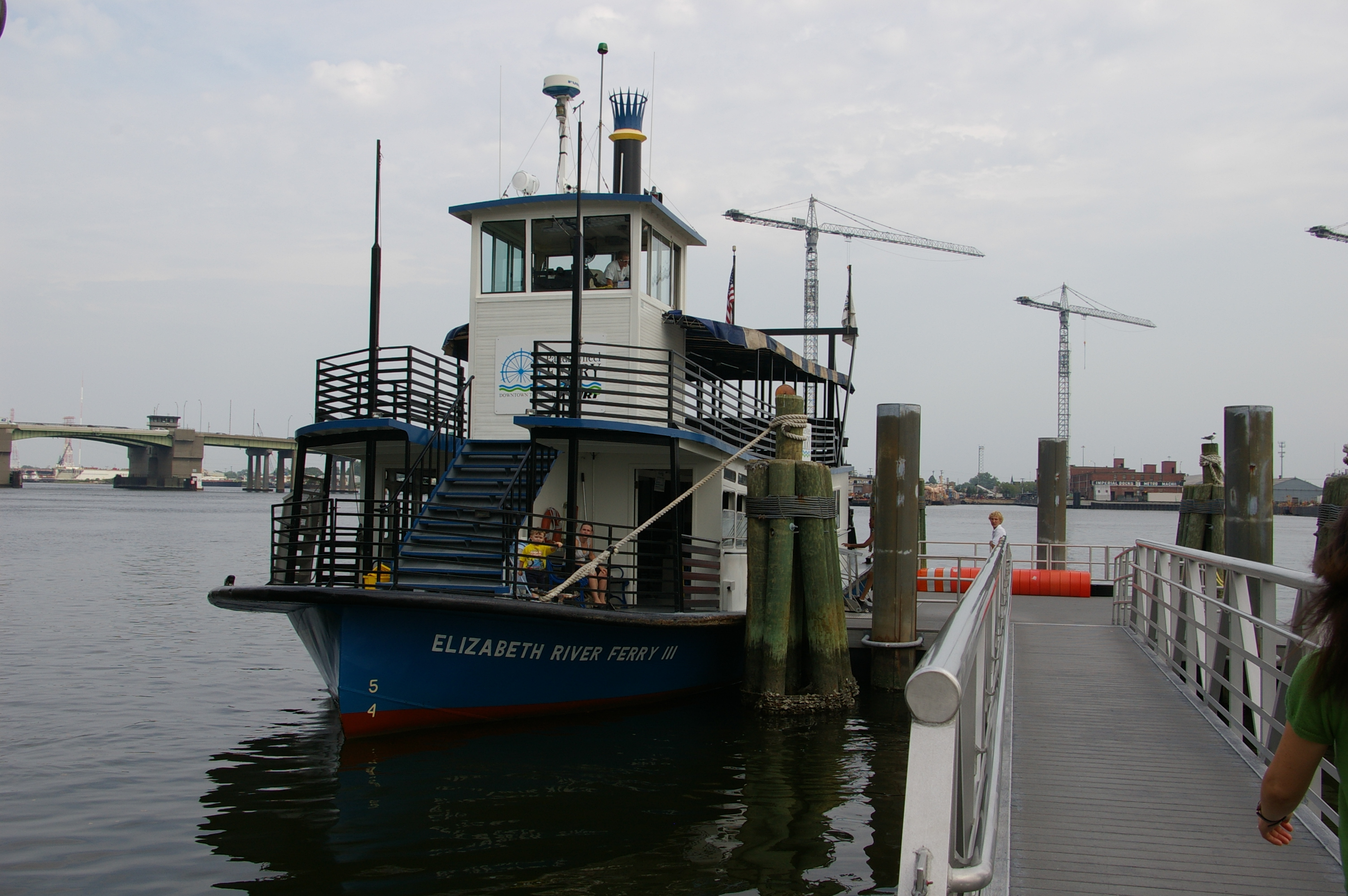
The Elizabeth River Ferry travels between Portsmouth and Norfolk

=== Law enforcement ===
==== Police Department ====
In 2019, the Portsmouth Police Department had about 255 sworn law enforcement officers and 380 total employees. In May 2019, Police Chief Tonya Chapman resigned from her position, claiming she was forced to resign and had experienced systemic racism during her tenure. She was replaced by Angela Greene who served as interim chief.

In June 2020, a Black Lives Matter protest took place in Portsmouth and resulted in the vandalism of the local Confederate monument. In August 2020, nineteen people, including state senator Louise Lucas, Chief Public Defender Brenda Spry, two additional public defenders, Portsmouth School Board member LaKeesha Atkinson, and three NAACP representatives were charged with felony vandalism of the monument. The charges were announced on August 17, 2020, by Police Chief Angela Greene, one day prior to a special legislative session pushing for policing reform. In order to obtain the charges, the police department circumvented the commonwealth's attorney, taking the charges directly to the magistrate. Judge Claire G. Cardwell dismissed the charges in November 2020. Cardwell found the charges concerning and believed the police did not take out the charges out of concern for public safety. Police Chief Angela Greene was fired shortly before the dismissal of the charges. Ten of the individuals who were charged sued the city for violating their rights, claiming that they were improperly defamed. In October 2021 the city settled the lawsuit, writing them checks for $15,000 each.

In September 2021, Renado Prince was promoted from Assistant Police Chief to Police Chief. At the end of 2021, Portsmouth reported 35 homcides, its highest number in years, up from 34 in 2020 and 16 in 2019. At the time, the police department had approximately 80 unfilled officer positions. In July 2022, former-Police Chief Tonya Chapman started a position as City Manager. Chapman fired Prince after he sent a text message criticizing her, only one week after she started as city manager. Prince was replaced with Stephen Jenkins. Chapman was later fired by the Portsmouth City Council in January 2023, and Prince was re-hired in June 2023 as an Assistant Police Chief.

Ten Portsmouth policemen have died in the line of duty, the first in 1871. Four of these died from gunshot wounds.

==== Sheriff's Office ====
The sheriff's office oversees the management of the Portsmouth City Jail and the Portsmouth Judicial Center. In 2021, the Porstmouth Sheriff's Office also began overseeing the school resource officer program for the city, providing officers to public schools. As of April 2023, the deputies at the Portsmouth Sheriff's Office were the lowest paid in Hampton Roads.

In September 2019, Judge Johnny E. Morrison approved the condemnation of the buildings at the Portsmouth Civic Center Complex, but allowed the Portsmouth City Jail located at the complex to continue operating. Sheriff Michael Moore sued the city for condemning the buildings without warning, arguing that it was the city's job to maintain the jail and stated the city had not maintained the building. At the time, the jail housed 250 inmates and employed 80 individuals. In January 2020, Morrison ruled that the city could not close the jail, stating that the jail must be "repaired and maintained." At the time, a privately owned facility, Hampton Roads Regional Jail HRRJ, was also operating in the city. The city's attorneys argued that the sheriff's office should send inmates to the regional jail, since the city already paid for spots at the jail. The sheriff's attorney argued that the Portsmouth City Jail was in relatively good condition and just needed a few repairs. Sheriff Moore stated that he refused to send inmates to Hampton Roads Regional Jail due to civil rights violations, medical problems, and inmate deaths that were investigated by the United States Department of Justice in 2018. In March 2020, the Portsmouth City Council voted 4–3 in favor of closing the jail due to its poor conditions. Following the vote, Morrison ruled once again that the jail could not be closed, despite the decision of the city council. The jail remained open. In April 2023, a woman sued the sheriff's office, claiming that, while at the Portsmouth City Jail, she was forced to pull down her pants in order to prove that she was menstruating and receive menstrual products.

On May 26, 2024, at approximately 1:30 a.m., a fire broke out in the basement of the Portsmouth City Jail. The fire started in a tool room in the basement and moved up an elevator shaft, spreading to the eighth floor. Sheriff Moore stated that the building was old and its internal workings were "starting to deteriorate pretty quickly." The jail moved inmates from the top floor to the bottom floor and began evacuating. More than 150 inmates were evacuated and transported to the facility that previously operated as the Hampton Roads Regional Jail. The city had purchased the property after its closure on April 1, 2024. No injuries were reported from the incident, but inmates and deputies were evaluated by medical teams.

Portsmouth does not have a juvenile detention facility. For more than thirty years, Portsmouth youth charged with crimes were held in the neighboring city of Chesapeake, at Chesapeake Juvenile Services. In the spring of 2023, Chesapeake Juvenile Services terminated its agreement with the Porstmouth Sheriff's Office. Since then, Portsmouth youth have been housed in Williamsburg, Northern Virginia, and Bristol. Bristol is a 15-hour round trip drive.

==== Hampton Roads Regional Jail ====
The Hampton Roads Regional Jail began operating in Portsmouth in June 1998. It took three years and $66 million to construct the 385,000-foot facility. At the time it was constructed, it was Virginia's third-largest correctional facility and could house up to 1,300 inmates. It was built in response to overcrowding at other facilities in the area, and housed inmates from Portsmouth, Norfolk, Newport News, Hampton, and Chesapeake. The United States Marshals Service also used the facility. The jail housed the highest mentally ill inmate population across the state of Virginia. The facility was managed by a 15-member board and the Hampton Roads Regional Jail Authority, which was made up of the city manager, the sheriff, and one council member from each of the five cities that used the jail.

In August 2015, JaMycheal Mitchell died while incarcerated at the jail. Mitchell was held at the jail due to allegations that he stole $5.05 worth of sweets from a 7-Eleven convenience store. Mitchell was mentally disabled, and lost over forty pounds over the course of his four months at the facility. A doctor had deemed Mitchell incompetent to stand trial in May 2015, and an order was entered requiring Mitchell to be sent to Eastern State Hospital to receive restoration services. For some reason, the hospital did not receive the order and Mitchell was not transported from the jail to the hospital. In May 2016, Mitchell's aunt alleged that jail staff had allowed Mitchell to starve to death while incarcerated. Other inmates stated that they had pleaded with the guards to help Mitchell, but were ignored. Mitchell's official cause of death was a heart condition and cachexia. The allegations stated that Mitchell had been denied many meals and left him naked with no bedding in a dirty cell. In March 2017, the Portsmouth Commonwealth's Attorney received allegations regarding Mitchell's death and asked the Virginia State Police to investigate.

In 2016, the U.S. Department of Justice began investigating the jail for possible civil rights violations. In 2018, the Department of Justice released a report detailing the jail's failures. The jail had ignored inmates' requests for medical treatment and sometimes left inmates in their cells for 22 hours or more. The Department of Justice found that the jail had violated the Americans with Disabilities Act and the Eighth Amendment to the United States Constitution due to its use of cruel and unusual punishment. The jail faced ongoing staffing challenges as the costs of operating increased, and in 2021 had more than 100 vacant positions. Between 2015 and 2024, more than twenty-five inmates died while incarcerated at the jail. Due to these violations, Hampton Roads Regional Jail was the only jail in the United States placed under Department of Justice oversight and a federal consent decree during the first Trump Administration. In 2020, under the consent decree, the jail agreed to implement changes to hire additional staff and reduce its use of solitary confinement; however, the sheriffs' offices in Portsmouth, Norfolk, and Chesapeake stated that they would cut back the number of inmates that they housed at the regional jail.

In March 2021, the American Correctional Association revoked the jail's accreditation. In April 2021, a Virginia Jail Review Committee recommended the closure of Hampton Roads Regional Jail. The committee's preliminary findings determined that the jail failed to meet minimum standards for supervision of inmates and did not provided twenty-four hour emergency medical and mental health care as required. The committee also believed that the jail knowingly withheld information and gave inaccurate case summaries in the deaths of three inmates.

By October 2023, the jail housed only 202 inmates, despite having room for up to 1,300. Portsmouth and Norfolk were rarely using the facility, with the Portsmouth sheriff stating that he refused to use the facility due to the civil rights violations. On April 1, 2024, Hampton Roads Regional Jail permanently closed after operating as a private jail in the city for twenty-five years.

After its closure, the city purchased the property. The Portsmouth City Jail moved its operations to the location in May 2024, after a fire broke out and rendered the original jail building inoperable.

=== Healthcare ===
==== Bon Secours Maryview Medical Center ====
The primary hospital serving the citizens of Portsmouth is Bon Secours Maryview Medical Center. It is a non-profit hospital with 346 beds, managed by Bon Secours Health System. The hospital was dedicated on March 4, 1945, and is located on High Street. During World War II, thousands of new shipyard workers and their families moved to the area, and the city saw a need for a new hospital. When it opened, the hospital was named Glensheallah Hospital. It was funded by the Federal Government. After the war, the government sold the hospital to the Catholic Church's Diocese of Richmond for $85,000. The Dioscese of Richmond agreed to operate the hospital with the Daughters of Wisdom. After its sale, the Daughters of Wisdom considered naming the hospital "Glensheallah" or "Glenmary", but they eventually settled on the name "Maryview" to honor the Virgin Mary and the Waterview area adjacent to the hospital. In 1984, the Diocese of Richmond transferred the hospital to the Sisters of Bon Secours Health Systems, Inc. in Marriottsville, Maryland, and the hospital became part of the Bon Secours Health Network.

==== Naval Medical Center Portsmouth ====
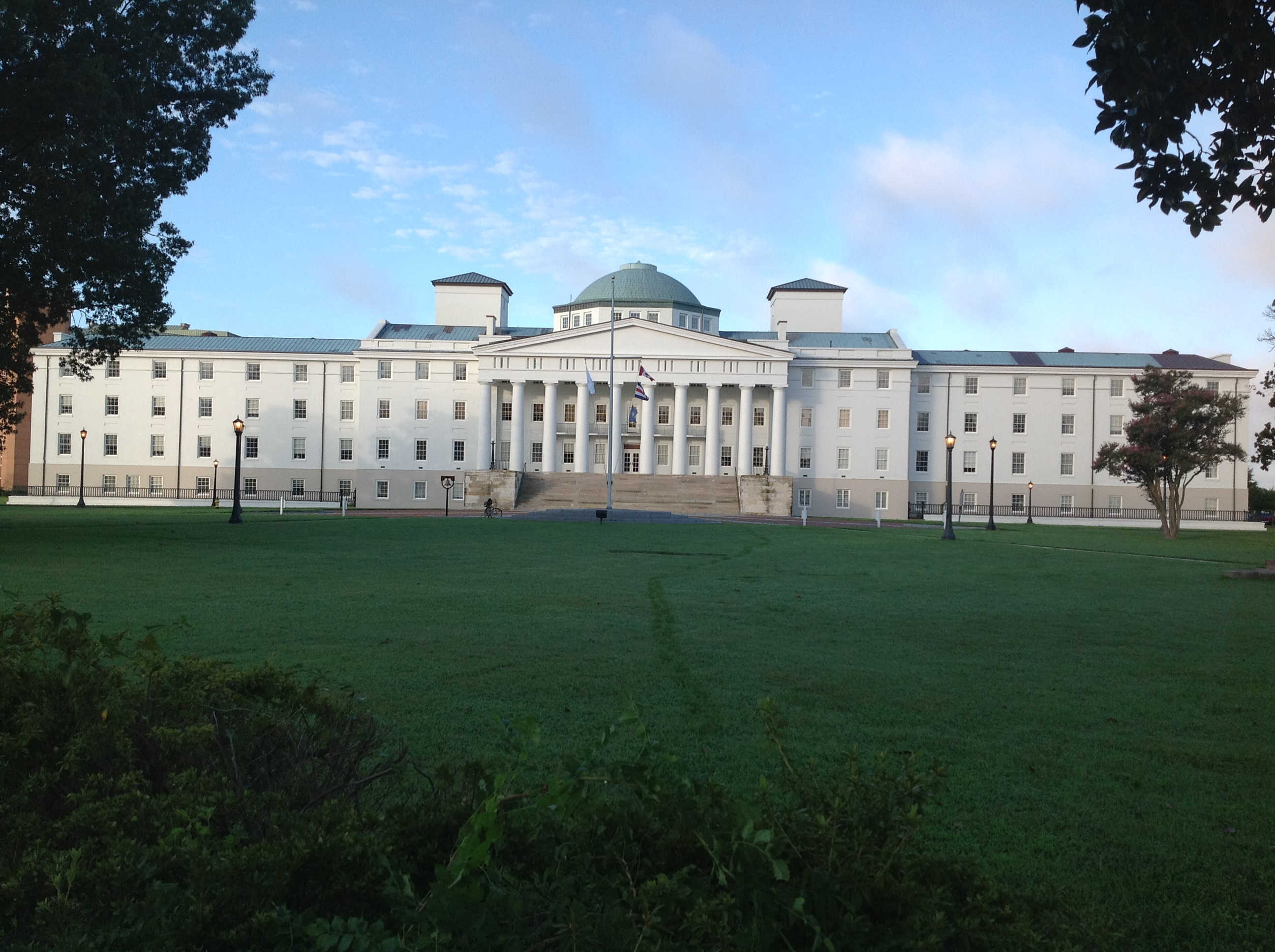
The Naval Medical Center, Portsmouth in 2012

The Naval Medical Center Portsmouth (NCMP) is a United States Navy medical center adjacent to the Olde Towne Historic District and Park View Historic District. Founded in 1827, it is the oldest continuously running hospital in the Navy medical system with the motto "First and Finest." At the time of its founding, the hospital was known as the Norfolk Naval Hospital. Later, the name was changed to Naval Hospital Portsmouth and eventually, Naval Medical Center Portsmouth. Building 1 of the center was built in 1830. Building 3, which was originally named Building 215, was built in 1959. Building 3 operated as the main hospital until Charette Building opened on April 30, 1999. The Charette building is 1.02 million square feet and has 353 inpatient beds. Due to its proximity to many military bases, the medical center has more than 100,000 beneficiaries enrolled for care.

==== Portsmouth General Hospital ====
In 1886, The Daughters of the King, a women's organization, was formed at Trinity Episcopal Church located in what is now Olde Towne Portsmouth. In 1895, the organization began reaching out to women in other churches across Portsmouth, hoping to open a hospital. In 1897, an eight-room house at 49 Court Street opened as King's Daughters' Hospital Home for the Sick. In 1898, the small hospital changed its name to the King's Daughters Hospital. By 1903, the hospital had outgrown its location on Court Street, and the hospital moved to a house on Emmet Street. The location was razed in 1914, so that a larger 3-story hospital could be built. In 1904, the hospital established a School of Nursing, located a block away from the hospital. In 1955, a fire destroyed part of the hospital, and it required extensive repairs. The hospital was renamed Portsmouth General Hospital in 1956. The School of Nursing operated until 1984, when the board of Portsmouth General voted to close the school due to financial problems. The last class of twelve nurses graduated from the school in 1986.

In 1988, Bon Secours attempted to purchase Portsmouth General, but it was instead sold to the nonprofit Tidewater Health Care. There were nine hospitals in South Hampton Roads at the time, and Portsmouth General could no longer sustain itself. In 1994, the hospital lost almost $200 on every patient admission. In May 1996, the sale of the hospital to Bon Secours Maryview Medical Center was announced, with Maryview stating that it intended to transfer services and then close the hospital. At the time of the sale, Portsmouth General Hospital employed 830 people, 350 of whom were expected to be laid of as the hospital closed. From 1996 to 1999, hospital services were gradually transferred to Maryview Medical Center in Portsmouth and Bon Secours Harbour View Medical Center in nearby Suffolk. The hospital officially ceased operations in 1999, after serving the people of Portsmouth for over 100 years.

== Notable people ==
- V. C. Andrews (1923–1986), bestselling novelist
- Cleo Anthony (1981–), American actor
- James P. Berkeley (1907–1985), USMC general and expert in Military communications
- Ken Bowersox (1956–), astronaut
- Marty Brennaman (1942–), long-time Cincinnati Reds radio broadcaster
- Karen Briggs (b. 1963), violinist
- Ruth Brown (1928–2006), R&B singer and actress
- Bebe Buell (1953–), Playboy Playmate, fashion model, singer, mother of Liv Tyler
- John T. Casteen III (1943–), President of the University of Virginia, born in Portsmouth
- Mahlon Clark (1923–2007), musician
- LaTasha Colander (b. 1976), track and field sprint star, 2000 Olympic gold medalist (4 × 400 m)
- Deborah Coleman (1956–2018), blues musician
- Henry Pierson Crowe, (1899–1991) United States Marine Corps officer
- Fanny Murdaugh Downing (1831–1894), author and poet
- Archie Elliott Jr., African-American retired judge and lawyer
- Archie Elliott III (1968–1993), Black 24-year-old shot by police in District Heights, Maryland on June 18, 1993
- Jamin Elliott (1979–), former NFL wide receiver with the Chicago Bears, New England Patriots, and Atlanta Falcons
- Missy Elliott (1971–), recording artist, award-winning producer, singer-songwriter, dancer, actress and clothing line designer
- Perry Ellis (1940–1986), fashion designer, founded a sportswear house in the mid-1970s
- Dorian Finney-Smith (1993–), Professional basketball player for the Los Angeles Lakers
- Clifton C. Garvin (1921–2016), President and CEO of Exxon
- Mordechai Gifter (1915–2001), among the foremost American religious leaders of Orthodox Jewry in the late 20th century
- Melvin Gregg (1988–), American actor and model
- Chandler Harper, (1914–2004), winner of the 1950 PGA golf championship
- Ken Hatfield, classical guitarist
- James W. Holley III (1926–2012), politician, first African-American mayor of any city in the Hampton Roads region (Portsmouth)
- W. Nathaniel "Nat" Howell (1939–2020), State Dept. Foreign Service officer, former Ambassador to Kuwait; professor emeritus, the University of Virginia
- Chad Hugo (1974–), American record producer and songwriter
- Ben Jones (1941–), actor "Cooter" on The Dukes of Hazzard; U.S. Congressman, moved to Portsmouth as a child
- T. J. Jordan (b. 1986), basketball player
- Jillian Kesner-Graver (1949–2007), actress
- Jack T. Kirby (1938–2009), historian of the southern United States, awarded the Bancroft Prize for his 2006 book Mockingbird Song: Ecological Landscapes of the South
- Erik S. Kristensen (1972–2005), US Navy SEAL Lieutenant Commander and highest decorated SEAL to be killed in Operation Red Wings
- Rita Lavelle (1947–), assistant administrator of the U.S. Environmental Protection Agency
- Louise Lucas (b. 1944), Virginia State Senator, and the first woman and first African-American to hold the position of President pro tempore of the Virginia Senate
- Nathan McCall (1955–), African-American author who grew up in the Cavalier Manor section of Portsmouth, Virginia
- Kenneth R. Melvin (1952–), former member of the Virginia House of Delegates, lawyer, and current jurist for the Third Circuit of Virginia
- LaShawn Merritt (b. 1986) – 2008 Olympic gold medal-winning sprinter
- Pete Mikolajewski (1943–), football player
- Johnny E. Morrison, jurist for the Third Circuit of Virginia
- George "Shadow" Morton (1941–2013) – record producer and songwriter
- James Murphy (1967–), metal guitarist, member of the bands Death, Testament, Obituary and Disincarnate
- Bismarck Myrick (b. 1940), U.S. Ambassador to the Republic of Liberia, U.S. Ambassador to Lesotho
- Wendell Cushing Neville (1870–1930), 14th Commandant of the U.S. Marine Corps
- Tommy Newsom (1929–2007), assistant bandleader for the Johnny Carson Band
- Patton Oswalt (1969–), writer, stand-up comedian, and actor
- Ace Parker (1912–2013), Pro Football Hall of Fame quarterback; also played baseball with the Philadelphia Athletics
- John L. Porter (1813–1893), President of the first City Council, a naval constructor for United States Navy and the Confederate States Navy.
- Dave Robertson (1889–1970), MLB outfielder 1912–22, played in World Series for New York Giants; born in Portsmouth
- William Russ (1950–), actor
- Bill Schneider (b. 1944), political commentator for CNN
- Don Scott (b. 1965), lawyer, Democratic politician, Navy veteran, and the first Black Speaker of the Virginia House of Delegates
- Dave Smith (1942–), poet, novelist
- Lon Solomon, Christian pastor and evangelist
- Dorin Spivey, NBA World and NABA Lightweight Boxing Champion
- William Spong Jr. (1920–1997), lawyer, Democratic politician, United States Senator for the state of Virginia.
- Brenda Spry, jurist for the Third Circuit of Virginia
- Wanda Sykes (1964–), writer, stand-up comedian, and actress
- Ted Thomas Sr. (1935–2020), Pentecostal African-American preacher, pastor of New Community Temple Church of God in Christ
- Clif Tinker (1956–), San Antonio, Texas-based commercial artist
- Adrienne Warren (1987–), Broadway singer and actress
- Mike Watt (1957–), bassist, singer and songwriter
- Khadijah Whittington (1986–), professional basketball player for the CSM Satu Mare of the Liga Națională
- Nicole Wray (1979–), singer and songwriter

== Sister city ==
- Portsmouth, United Kingdom

== See also ==
- National Register of Historic Places listings in Portsmouth, Virginia
