= William Crawford (Virginia politician) =

William Crawford (his last name was also spelled Craford or Crafford) (died before April 15, 1762) was an American soldier, politician, and founder of Portsmouth, Virginia. He served as a member of the Virginia House of Burgesses for over thirty years.

== Background ==
Crawford was born at an unknown date, possibly in the 1680s, to George and Abigail Mason Crawford. Some materials state that he was born in Portsmouth, England but it is generally accepted that he was born in Norfolk County. Both of his parents died while he was still a child and in September 1699 their immigrant grandfather made them his principal heirs. It is believed that Crawford never married and in 1711 he patented 173 acres of land in Nansemond County and in 1716 he patented an additional 1,129 acres in Norfolk County. He served in Norfolk County's county court and on May 4, 1725 he was appointed sheriff. By 1742 he had become a colonel of militia and in 1748, served as county lieutenant.

By January 27, 1762 Crawford was in poor health and on this day he wrote a will leaving part of his large estate to his sister and to others, including his late housekeeper's children. Crawford's exact date of death is unknown but he died at some point before April 15 of that same year, as this was the date when his will was proven in the Norfolk County Court.

== Political career ==
Crawford was elected to the House of Burgesses in 1712, where he represented Norfolk County. He continued to serve in this position for about thirty years without interruption except for 1734, when he gave up his seat after he was again appointed as Norfolk County's sheriff. Crawford was re-elected to the House of Burgesses the following year.

== Founding of Portsmouth ==
Portsmouth was founded in the spring of 1752 by the General Assembly, likely at Crawford's request. He began selling lots in this town later that same year and intended to establish a courthouse there, but this was not accomplished during his lifetime.
