= Park View Historic District =

Historic district in Virginia, United States

- U.S. National Register of Historic Places
- U.S. Historic district
- Virginia Landmarks Register
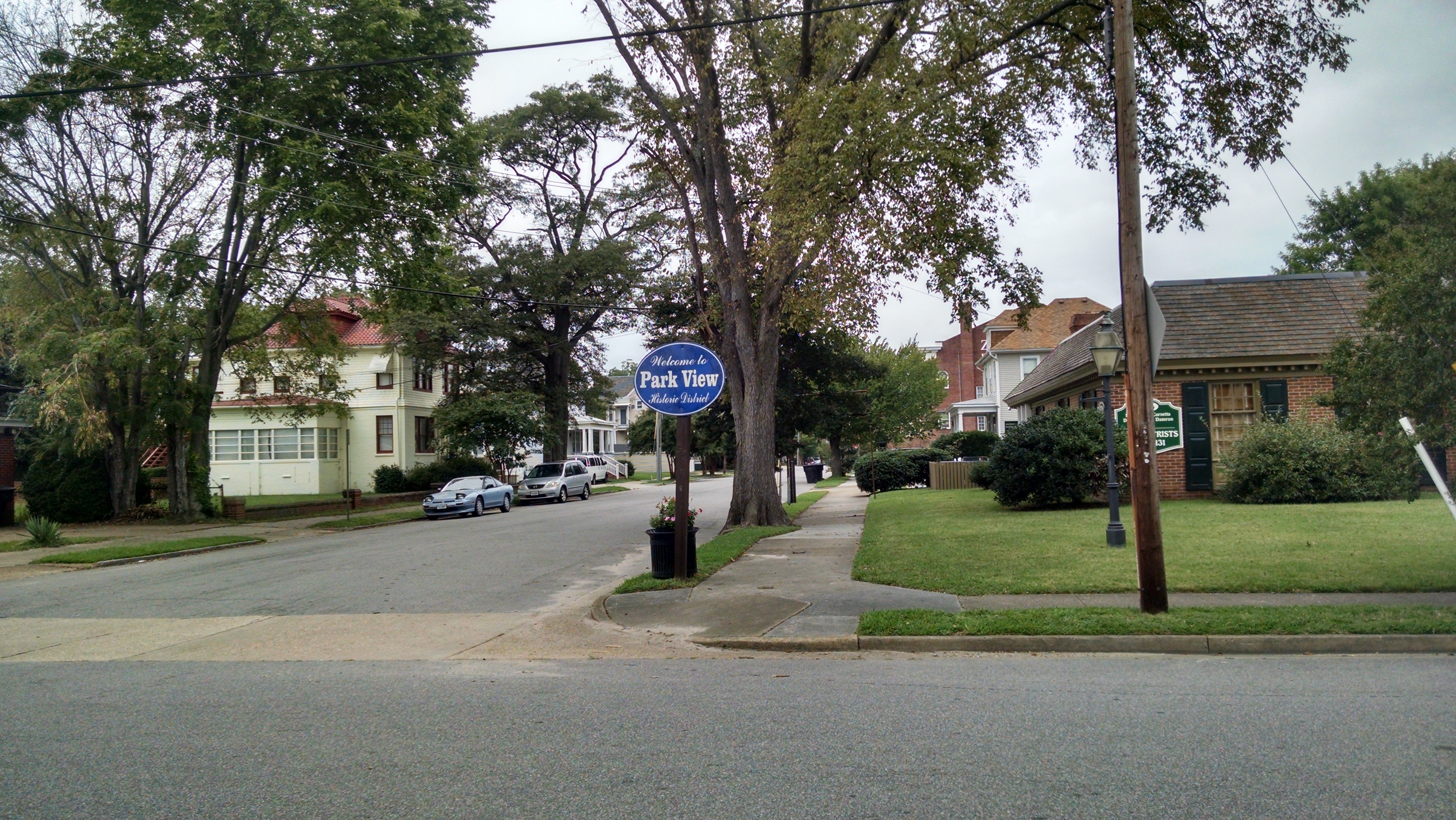
- Entrance to the district

- Location within Virginia Location within the United States
- Location: Roughly bounded by Elm and Parkview Aves., Fort Lane, Blair, and Harrell Sts., Portsmouth, Virginia
- Coordinates: 36°50′31″N 76°18′40″W
- Area: 53 acres (21 ha)
- Architectural style: Colonial Revival, Queen Anne, American Foursquare
- NRHP reference No.: 84000047
- VLR No.: 124-0055

Significant dates
- Added to NRHP: October 4, 1984
- Designated VLR: August 21, 1984

Park View Historic District is a national historic district located at Portsmouth, Virginia. It encompasses 295 contributing buildings in a primarily residential section of northeast Portsmouth. It was developed in the late-19th and early-20th centuries, and includes notable examples of Queen Anne, Colonial Revival, and American Foursquare style single family residences.

It was listed on the National Register of Historic Places in 1984.
