= West Norfolk, Virginia =

Neighborhood in Portsmouth, Virginia, US

Coordinates: 36°52′N 76°23′W

West Norfolk is a neighborhood in the independent city of Portsmouth, Virginia. It was part of the city of Chesapeake until January 1, 1968, and lies west of the Western Branch Elizabeth River. The Churchland Bridge (US 17) and West Norfolk Bridge (SR 164) connect West Norfolk to the rest of Portsmouth.
