= National Register of Historic Places listings in Portsmouth, Virginia =

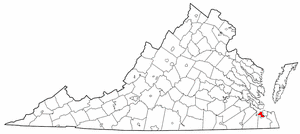
Location of Portsmouth in Virginia

This is a list of the National Register of Historic Places listings in Portsmouth, Virginia.

This is intended to be a complete list of the properties and districts on the National Register of Historic Places in the independent city of Portsmouth, Virginia, United States. The locations of National Register properties and districts for which the latitude and longitude coordinates are included below, may be seen in an online map.

There are 23 properties and districts listed on the National Register in the city, including 2 National Historic Landmarks. Another property was once listed but has been removed.

This National Park Service list is complete through NPS recent listings posted October 9, 2026.

== Current listings ==
	Name on the Register	Image	Date listed	Location	Description
1	Abigarlos	Abigarlos	May 21, 2019 (#100003975)	3321 Carney Farm Ln. 36°51′02″N 76°22′16″W	
2	Cedar Grove Cemetery	Cedar Grove Cemetery	October 15, 1992 (#92001366)	301 Fort Ln. 36°50′20″N 76°18′29″W	
3	Commodore Theatre	Commodore Theatre	February 27, 1997 (#97000203)	421 High St. 36°50′06″N 76°18′07″W	
4	Confederate Monument	Confederate Monument	September 4, 1997 (#97000956)	Junction of High and Court Sts. 36°50′08″N 76°18′03″W	Destroyed, 2020
5	Craddock Historic District	Craddock Historic District	June 20, 1974 (#74002240)	Bounded by Paradise Creek, Victory Boulevard, and the George Washington Highway; 36°48′07″N 76°19′04″W	
6	Downtown Portsmouth Historic District	Downtown Portsmouth Historic District	January 16, 2004 (#03001485)	Roughly bounded by Interstate 264, Middle St., Primrose St., and Queen St.; also Columbia Street, County Street, Court Street, Crawford Street, High Street, Middle Street, Thomas Circle; 36°50′07″N 76°18′14″W	Second set of addresses represent a boundary increase approved October 15, 2026.
7	Drydock No. 1	Drydock No. 1	February 26, 1970 (#70000862)	Norfolk Naval Shipyard; 36°49′14″N 76°17′35″W	
8	Fort Nelson Chapter of the Daughters of the American Revolution Chapter House	Fort Nelson Chapter of the Daughters of the American Revolution Chapter House	August 8, 2007 (#07000805)	506 Westmoreland Ave. 36°50′00″N 76°21′49″W	
9	LIGHTSHIP No. 101, PORTSMOUTH	LIGHTSHIP No. 101, PORTSMOUTH	May 5, 1989 (#89001080)	London Slip, Elizabeth River; 36°50′13″N 76°17′46″W	
10	Monumental Methodist Church	Monumental Methodist Church	January 15, 2004 (#03001430)	450 Dinwiddie St. 36°50′09″N 76°18′10″W	
11	Park View Historic District	Park View Historic District	October 4, 1984 (#84000047)	Roughly bounded by Elm and Parkview Aves., Fort Lane, Blair, and Harrell Sts. 36°50′31″N 76°18′40″W	
12	Port Norfolk Historic District	Port Norfolk Historic District	September 30, 1983 (#83003299)	Roughly bounded by Bayview Boulevard, Chatauqua Ave., Hartford St., Douglas Ave., and Hull Creek; 36°50′54″N 76°20′14″W	
13	Portsmouth Community Library	Portsmouth Community Library	August 12, 2010 (#10000544)	906 Elm St. 36°49′55″N 76°18′47″W	
14	Portsmouth Courthouse	Portsmouth Courthouse	April 29, 1970 (#70000876)	Northwestern corner of Court and High Sts. 36°50′08″N 76°18′05″W	
15	Portsmouth Naval Hospital	Portsmouth Naval Hospital	April 13, 1972 (#72001516)	On Hospital Point at Washington and Crawford Sts. 36°50′50″N 76°18′19″W	
16	Portsmouth Olde Towne Historic District	Portsmouth Olde Towne Historic District	September 8, 1970 (#70000877)	Bounded by Crawford Parkway, London St., the Elizabeth River, and extending 0.1 miles west of Washington St.; also Grace and Queen Sts. 36°50′20″N 76°18′07″W	Grace and Queen represent a boundary increase of October 6, 1983
17	Pythian Castle	Pythian Castle	October 30, 1980 (#80004316)	610-612 Court St. 36°50′02″N 76°18′04″W	
18	Quarters A, B, and C, Norfolk Naval Shipyard	Quarters A, B, and C, Norfolk Naval Shipyard	December 19, 1974 (#74002242)	Norfolk Naval Shipyard; 36°49′36″N 76°17′51″W	
19	St. Paul's Catholic Church	St. Paul's Catholic Church	June 6, 2002 (#02000619)	518 High St. 36°50′08″N 76°18′13″W	
20	Seaboard Coastline Building	Seaboard Coastline Building	October 10, 1985 (#85003129)	1 High St. 36°50′06″N 76°17′48″W	
21	Shea Terrace Elementary School	Shea Terrace Elementary School	September 14, 2002 (#02001002)	253 Constitution Ave. 36°50′23″N 76°19′29″W	
22	Trinity Episcopal Church	Trinity Episcopal Church	May 14, 1973 (#73002219)	High and Court Sts. 36°50′06″N 76°18′04″W	
23	Truxtun Historic District	Truxtun Historic District	September 16, 1982 (#82004581)	Portsmouth and Deep Creek Boulevards and Manly, Dahlia, Hobson, Dewey, and Bagley Sts. 36°48′59″N 76°19′48″W	

== Former listing ==
	Name on the Register	Image	Date listed	Date removed	Location	Description
1	The Circle	The Circle	March 8, 2006 (#06000120)	February 7, 2017	3010 High St. 36°50′05″N 76°20′18″W	Demolished in August 2013

== See also ==
- List of National Historic Landmarks in Virginia
- National Register of Historic Places listings in Virginia
