= The NorVa =

Coordinates: 36°51′0.7″N 76°17′22″W

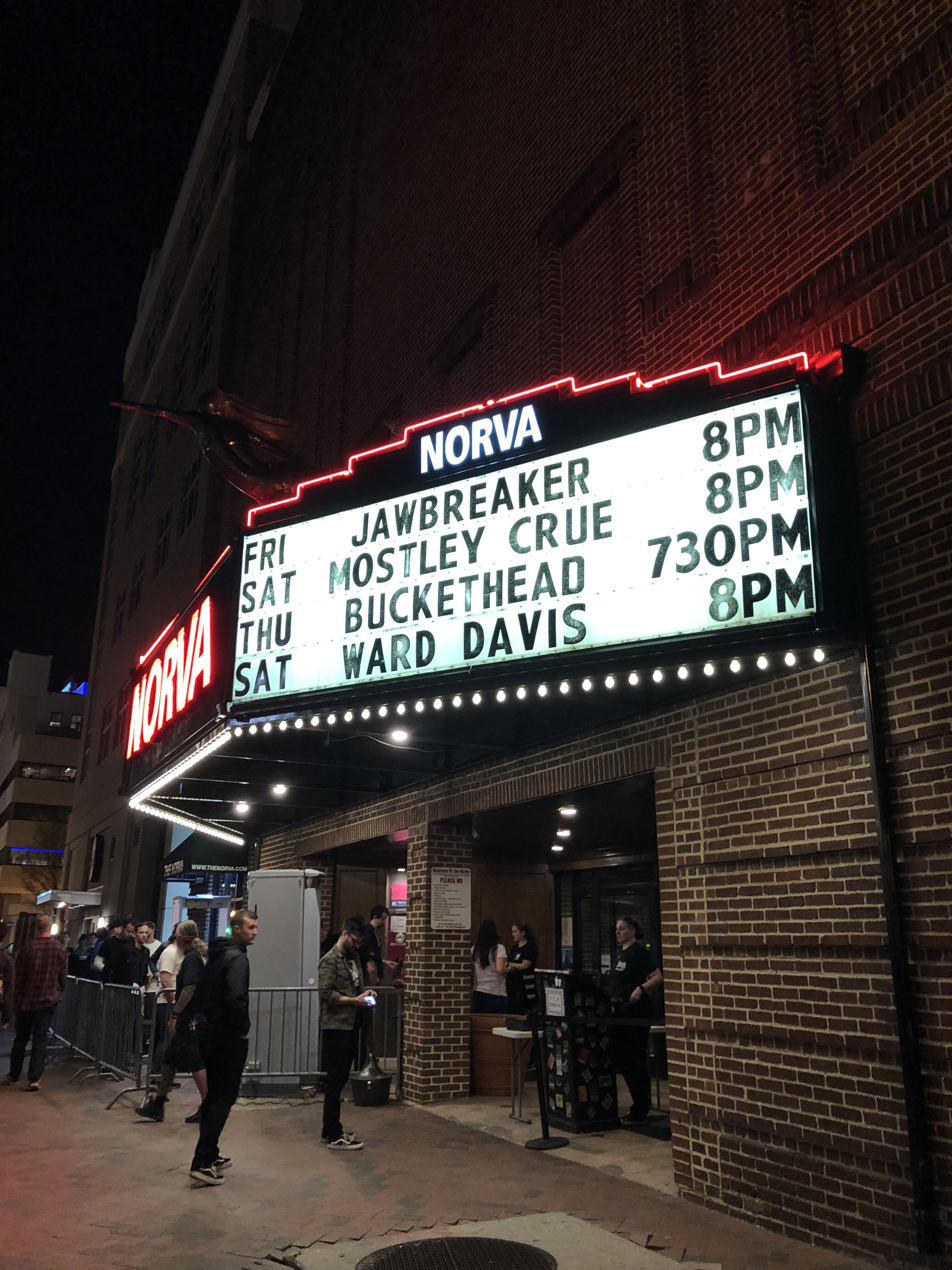
- Marquee of venue in late March 2019
- Former names: Norva Theatre (1922-80)
- Address: 317 Monticello Ave; Norfolk, VA 23510-2407
- Location: Downtown Norfolk
- Owner: Anschutz Entertainment Group
- Capacity: 1,450

Construction
- Opened: November 27, 1922
- Renovated: 1998
- Reopened: April 28, 2000
- Cost: $500,000 ($9.03 million in 2025 dollars)

Website
- Venue Website

The NorVa is a performing venue located in Norfolk, Virginia, the name being a syllabic abbreviation of the city and state of its location.

== About ==
The theatre was the brainchild of local music venue entrepreneurs Bill Reid and Rick Mersel, who have also developed the Atlantic Union Bank Pavilion and have ties to the development of Veterans United Home Loans Amphitheater. In 2014, the NorVa was acquired by Anschutz Entertainment Group.

The original venue opened in 1922 as a 2,000-seat motion picture and live entertainment (vaudeville) theater. It continued as a movie theater into the 1970s. The building served as home to the Downtown Athletic Club from 1980 until 1998. The NorVa reopened as a concert venue on April 28, 2000, with James Brown performing the inaugural show.

== Movie theater history ==
- Built by The Johnson Construction Co.
- Operated by the W.W.V. (Wells, Wilmer, and Vincent) Co., Inc.
- Part of the Wells entertainment group which included Granby Theatre and Wells Theatre.
- William S. Wilder was the first manager before opening The Colley Theater (Naro Expanded Cinema) in 1936, and The Commodore Theater in 1945.
- Newspaper articles of the time used "theater" and "theatre" interchangeably.
- Pipe organ manufactured by The Robert Morton Co.
- Norva Concert Orchestra Director - Prof. Charles Borjes
- Original Organist - Jack Griffith
- Chairs furnished by Virginia School Supply Co. of Richmond, Virginia.

1922

- November 27 - Bright Eyes and The Man Who Saw Tomorrow were the first films.
- November 30 - The Sin Flood
