= Portsmouth Naval Shipyard Museum =

Maritime museum in Portsmouth, Virginia

Coordinates: 36.8359°N 76.2968°W

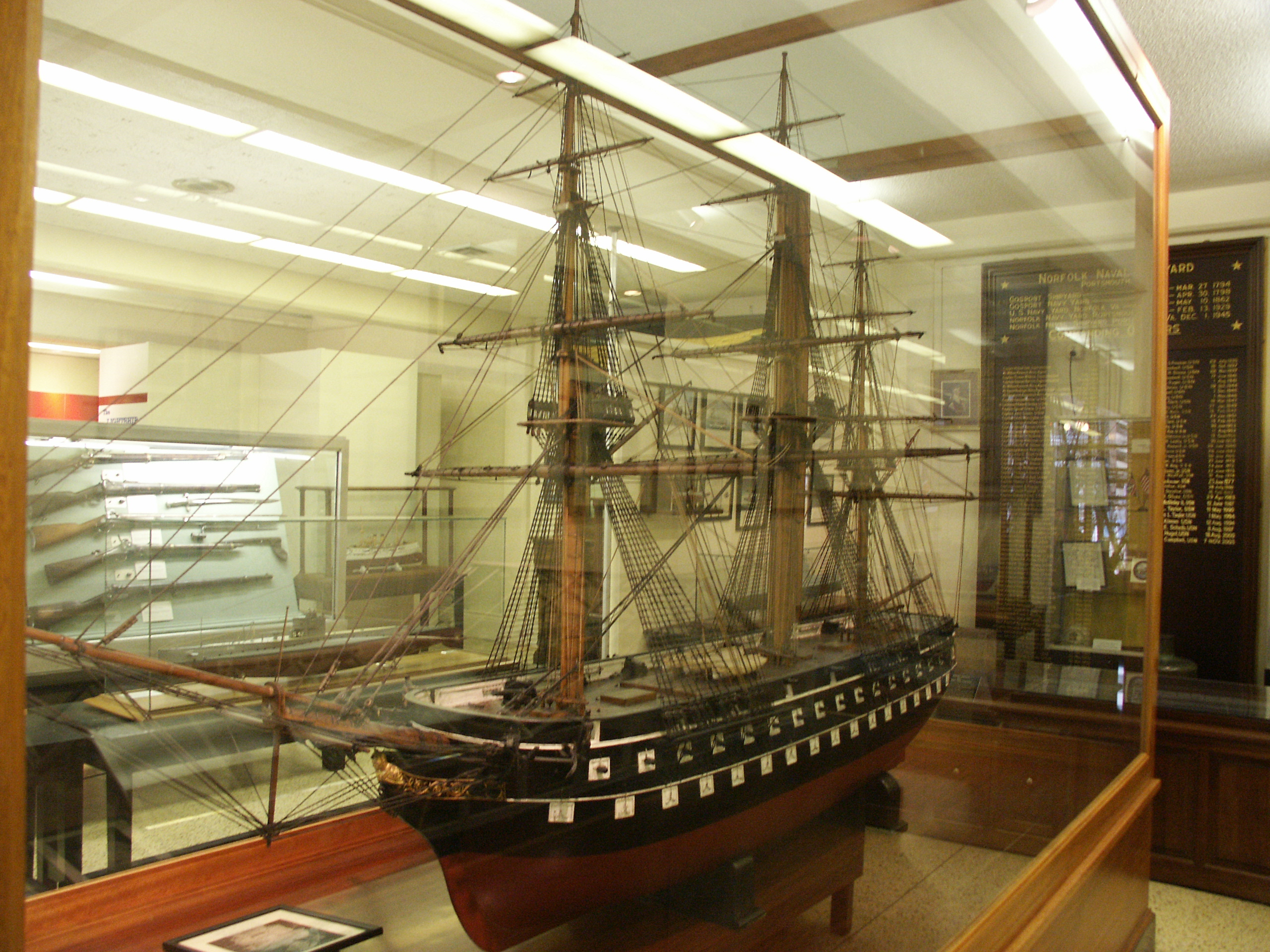
Model of the USS Delaware (1820) in the museum.

The Portsmouth Naval Shipyard Museum and the associated Lightship Museum are located on the downtown Portsmouth, Virginia, United States waterfront. The museum covers the 250+ year relationship with the shipyard - America's oldest and largest naval shipyard located on the Portsmouth Waterfront. The city and the shipyard have been intertwined since the founding of the Gosport Shipyard in 1767, which was later renamed Norfolk Navy Yard and finally Norfolk Naval Shipyard. This rich history is told through exhibits, hands-on programs and special events.

The Lightship Portsmouth is a museum ship that is part of the Portsmouth Naval Shipyard Museum. Built in 1915 and began service as part of the U.S. Lighthouse Service in 1916. In 1964, the lightship was retired to Portsmouth, Virginia. In 1989, the Lightship Portsmouth was designated a National Historic Landmark. Now a museum, the ship's quarters are fitted out realistically and filled with artifacts, uniforms, photographs, models, and more.

== See also ==
- List of maritime museums in the United States
- United States Naval Shipbuilding Museum
