= James Chisholm (priest) =

American episcopal priest

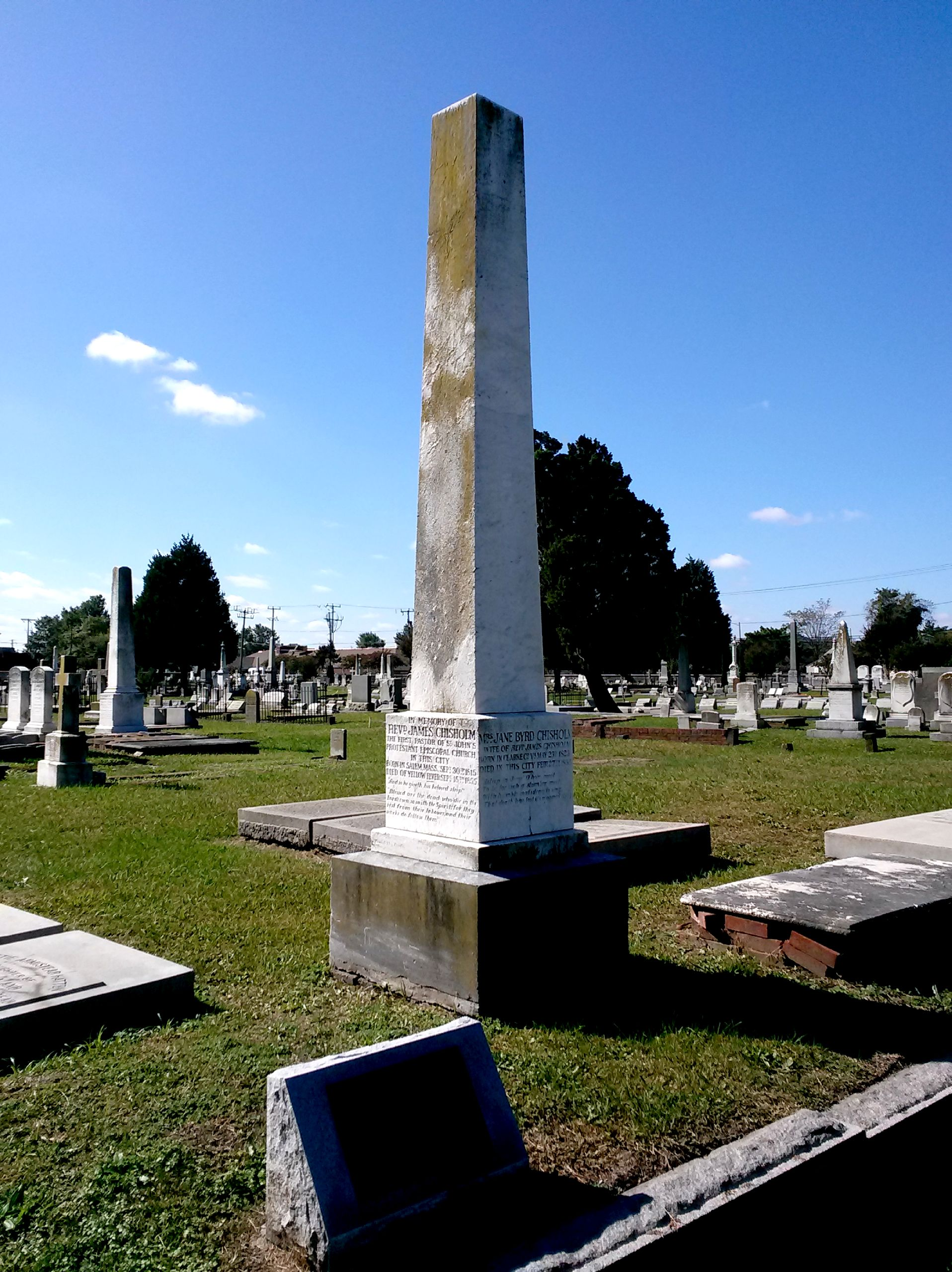
Rev. Chisholm memorial in Cedar Grove Cemetery, Portsmouth, Virginia

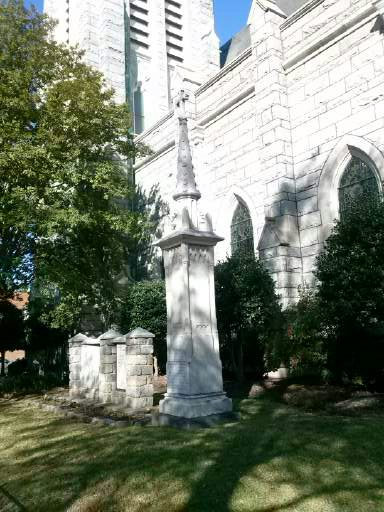
Rev. Devlin memorial at historic St. Paul's Catholic Church

James Chisholm (September 30, 1815 – September 15, 1855) was an Episcopal priest in Portsmouth, Virginia who died of yellow fever after working to assist others (of every denomination) stricken by an epidemic.

Chisholm was born in Salem, Massachusetts and moved to Virginia to teach. He converted to the Episcopal church and was ordained, then served as the first rector of St. John's Episcopal Church in Portsmouth, founded in 1848 as part of the Oxford Movement although with the permission of Virginia's bishop, William Meade.

In February, 1855, Rev. Chisholm's wife died, leaving him to care for two young sons. When yellow fever struck Portsmouth and nearby Norfolk in the summer and one of his sons fell ill, Chisholm sent his boys to live with relatives, but returned to the city. Almost all other leading citizens, ranging from doctors to clergy, left, but Rev. Chisholm remained to assist those stricken by the epidemic, with not only pastoral care, but food, medical care and even digging graves. He worked closely with Rev. Francis Devlin of the city's St. Paul's Catholic Church to assist Irish immigrants who continued to live in "pestilential abodes". As the disease abated in the fall, Chisholm had been so weakened by his efforts (and news that one of his sons had died) that he himself succumbed at the Portsmouth Naval Hospital, becoming one of the 3,200 deaths in a city which had about 12,000 residents the previous winter.

About 20 people turned out for his funeral, conducted by a Baptist minister. Rev. Chisholm is buried in Portsmouth's Cedar Grove cemetery. His memoirs of that epidemic, edited shortly after his death to emphasize the Christian values which prompted the somewhat delicate and retiring (if not bashful) cleric to exhibit fortitude through that epidemic are available at various sources.
