= Drydock Number One, Norfolk Naval Shipyard =

- U.S. National Register of Historic Places
- U.S. National Historic Landmark
- Virginia Landmarks Register
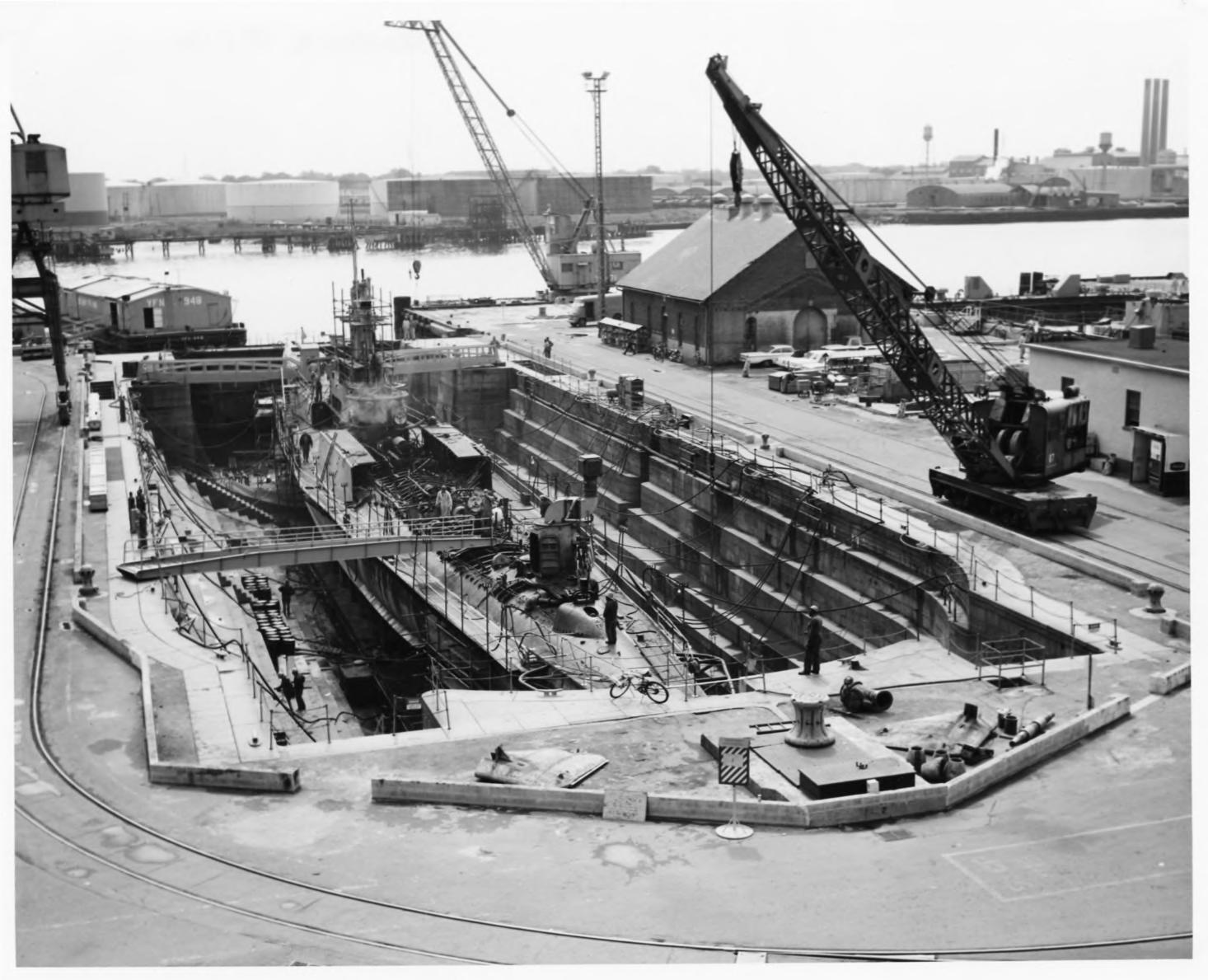

- Location within Virginia Location within the United States
- Location: Norfolk Naval Shipyard, Portsmouth, Virginia
- Coordinates: 36°49′14″N 76°17′35″W
- Area: 2 acres (0.81 ha)
- Built: 1827
- NRHP reference No.: 70000862
- VLR No.: 124-0029

Significant dates
- Added to NRHP: February 26, 1970
- Designated NHL: November 11, 1971
- Designated VLR: December 2, 1969

Drydock Number One is the oldest operational drydock facility in the United States. Located in Norfolk Naval Shipyard in Portsmouth, Virginia, it was put into service in 1834, and has been in service since then. Its history includes the refitting of USS Merrimack, which was modified to be the Confederate Navy ironclad CSS Virginia. It was declared a National Historic Landmark in 1971.

== Description and history ==
Drydock Number One is located on the west side of the central branch of the Elizabeth River. It measures 319.5 feet (97.4 m) in length, and is built of Massachusetts granite, stepped to allow access to and bracing of ships under repair. Stairs at the land end provide access to the various levels. The drydock can accommodate a maximum vessel length of 291.6 feet (88.9 m) with a 39.33-foot (11.99 m) beam. Depth is 30 feet (9.1 m). the dock can be dewatered in 40 minutes and flooded in 90 minutes.

The drydock was built between 1827 and 1834, and cost $974,365.65, a very high price at that time. It may have been designed by Loammi Baldwin Jr., then the Navy's superintendent of drydocks, and its construction was overseen by William P. S. Sanger, a civil engineer. The drydock was first used in June 1833, when USS Delaware was drydocked for recommissioning, the first time a large vessel was drydocked in the United States.

During the opening phase of the American Civil War in April 1861, Union forces were dispatched from Washington on the USS Pawnee to assist in destroying military assets as the shipyard was being abandoned; however, efforts to blow-up the dry dock were unsuccessful. The shipyard was then taken over by the Confederate Navy, which was a severe blow to the Union, and it was here that USS Merrimack was modified to become the ironclad CSS Virginia.

Today, Drydock Number One is still in operation, used primarily to service U.S. Navy vessels.

== See also ==
- List of U.S. National Historic Landmark ships, shipwrecks, and shipyards
- List of National Historic Landmarks in Virginia
- National Register of Historic Places listings in Portsmouth, Virginia
