= Archibald C. Godwin =

Confederate general during the American Civil War

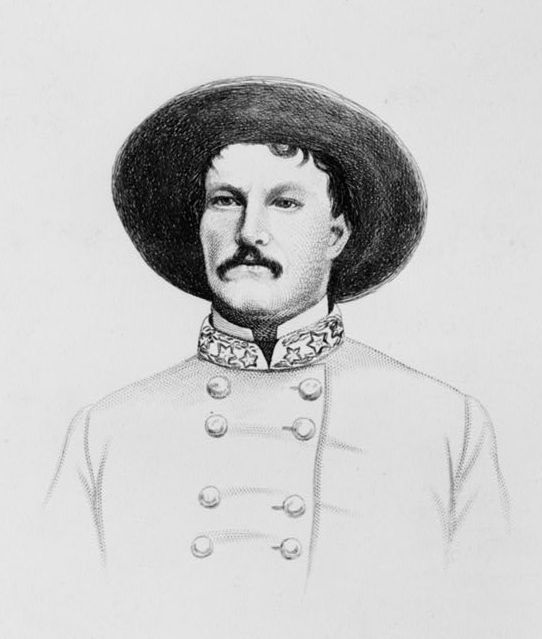
- Born: 1831; Nansemond County, Virginia
- Died: September 19, 1864 (aged 32–33); Winchester, Virginia
- Burial place: Stonewall Cemetery in Winchester, Virginia
- Military career
- Allegiance: Confederate States of America
- Branch: Confederate States Army
- Service years: 1861-1864
- Rank: Colonel; Brigadier General (unconfirmed)
- Conflicts: American Civil War; Battle of Fredericksburg; Battle of Chancellorsville; Battle of Gettysburg; Battle of Opequon †

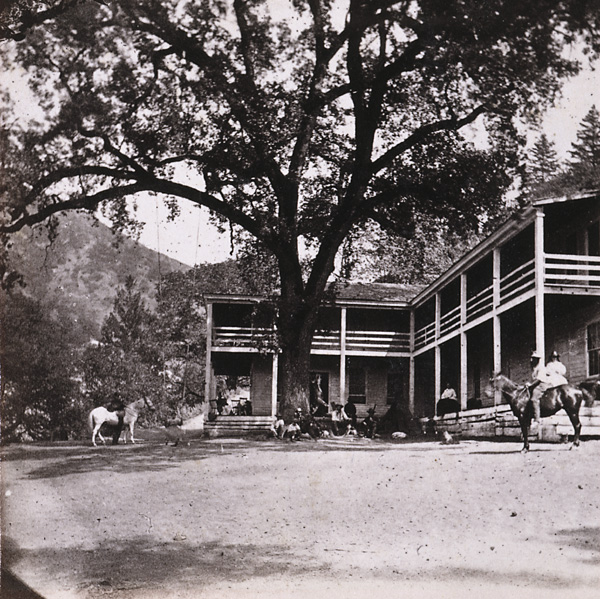
The Geysers Hotel

Archibald Campbell Godwin (1831 – September 19, 1864), a brigadier general in the Confederate States Army who was killed at the Battle of Opequon during the American Civil War. Due to his death soon after his appointment, the Confederate Senate never confirmed Godwin's promotion to the grade of brigadier general.

== Early life ==
Archibald C. Godwin was born in Nansemond County, Virginia, in 1831, the son of Jonathan Lewis and Julia Campbell Godwin, a daughter of General Archibald Campbell, who was administering U.S. Public Lands of Missouri and the Northwest Territory in 1837. Before his first birthday, he was moved to Portsmouth, Virginia, to live with his grandmother Julia Hatton Godwin. He was raised and educated in Portsmouth. Around the age of nineteen he went to California hoping to strike it rich during the California Gold Rush.

== Life in California ==
Godwin was able to build wealth on cattle, timber, real estate and mining in Northern California. In 1854, he was residing at Godwin's Place west of the Russian River in the Sonoma County, present-day Geyserville. He owned 640 acres of nearby land and was engaged in mercantile and livestock business. Since approximately 150 Native Americans lived on the Russian River, the Federal government appointed the 6'6" Godwin as an Indian agent, and Charles F. Winslow after visiting the area wrote that they were "under Mr. Godwin's complete control." There were hot springs on the property which later became known as The Geysers, and Godwin built The Geysers Resort Hotel to encourage visitors. He discovered that his land possessed rich cinnabar ore deposits and in 1859 filed mining claims, which he had to defend in court as others disputed his right to mine quicksilver. Godwin obtained a legal license after passing exams and successfully represented himself in court in Santa Rosa. He became involved in local politics, and was elected a Justice of the Peace in 1855. He served on the board of directors of the Geyser Road committee. There are accounts that in 1860 Godwin lost the Democratic Party nomination for governor of California by one vote that are not confirmed by documents. After Virginia seceded from the Union, Godwin placed an advertisement in Petaluma Journal looking for a renter of his business interests in The Geysers, and turned his other property holdings to friends.

== Civil War ==
=== Provost's duties ===
Godwin returned to his native state when the American Civil War broke out in 1861. He initially served as a captain and then major in the provost's department and was assistant provost marshal in charge of Libby Prison. Later Jefferson Davis assigned to him the task of running the prison stockade in Salisbury, North Carolina, for anticipated Union prisoners. Godwin, who became the second prison commandant, had acquired a reputation for being quite cruel to Union captives. There had been some discussion after the war of prosecuting Godwin until it was discovered that he was already dead. Major John Henry Gee, one of nine commandants of Salisbury Prison Camp, was put on trial in 1866 in Raleigh on the charges of cruelty and conspiracy regarding his management of the prison but was acquitted on all charges.

=== In the front line ===
Godwin was transferred to the front lines taking the colonelcy of the 57th North Carolina Infantry on July 17, 1862. His first action came at the Battle of Fredericksburg on December 13, 1862. He also served as a member of Robert F. Hoke's Brigade during the Fredericksburg phase of the Chancellorsville Campaign. Hoke had been wounded and was replaced by Colonel Isaac E. Avery. Godwin marched under the command of Avery to Gettysburg, Pennsylvania, in the summer of 1863 participating in the attack on Cemetery Hill on July 2 at the Battle of Gettysburg. With the mortal wounding of Colonel Avery, Godwin temporarily assumed command of the brigade and led it back into Virginia and until November 7, 1863, when he was captured at Rappahannock Bridge. He was exchanged in 1864, and promoted on August 5 to brigadier general commanding what had formerly been Hoke's Brigade in Major General Stephen D. Ramseur's division. On the other hand, the Eichers state that Godwin's appointment was not confirmed by the Confederate Senate and therefore his promotion did not become legally effective.

== Death ==
On September 19 he was killed at the Third Battle of Winchester. Godwin is buried at Stonewall Cemetery in Winchester, Virginia. There is also a monument for him at Cedar Grove Cemetery in Portsmouth, Virginia.

== See also ==
- List of American Civil War generals (Acting Confederate)
