= United States lightship Portsmouth (LV-101) =

American lightvessel, launched 1916

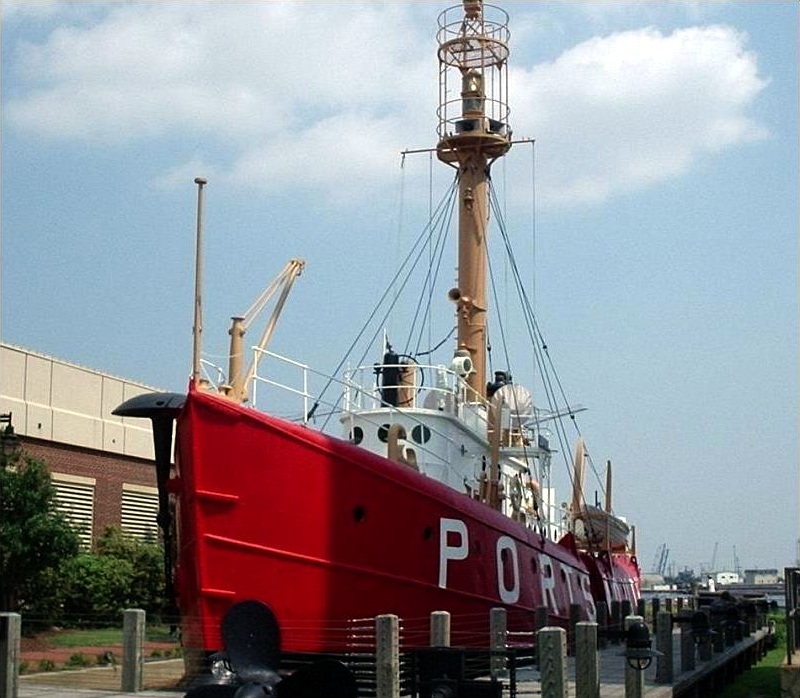
- Lightship Portsmouth (LV 101)

History

United States
- Name: LV 101; Portsmouth (as a museum ship)
- Builder: Pusey & Jones
- Laid down: 1915
- Launched: 12 January 1916
- Acquired: 2 September 1916
- Decommissioned: 23 March 1964
- In service: 1916
- Out of service: 1963
- Identification: LV-101 (1916–1939); WAL-524 (1939–)
- Status: Museum ship

General characteristics
- Type: Lightship
- Displacement: 360 long tons (366 t)
- Length: 101 ft 10 in (31.04 m)
- Beam: 25 ft (7.6 m)
- Draft: 11 ft 4 in (3.45 m)
- Propulsion: Meitz & Weiss 4-cylinder kerosene engine, 200 hp (149 kW) 1944: Cooper-Bessemer 315HP Six Cylinder Diesel
- Speed: 8 knots (15 km/h; 9.2 mph) (4 Cylinder) 8.2 knots (15.2 km/h; 9.4 mph) (6 Cylinder)
- Armament: None
- Lightship No. 101, Portsmouth
- U.S. National Register of Historic Places
- U.S. National Historic Landmark
- Virginia Landmarks Register
- Location within Virginia
- Location: Portsmouth, Virginia
- Coordinates: 36°50′19″N 76°17′55″W
- Built: 1916
- Architect: Pusey & Jones Lightship; US Lighthouse Establishment
- NRHP reference No.: 89001080
- VLR No.: 124-0102

Significant dates
- Added to NRHP: 5 May 1989
- Designated NHL: 5 May 1989
- Designated VLR: March 19, 1997

United States Lightship 101, known as Portsmouth (LV-101) as a museum ship, was first stationed at Cape Charles, Virginia. Today she is at the Portsmouth Naval Shipyard Museum in Portsmouth, Virginia. Portsmouth never had a lightship station; however, when the vessel was dry docked there as a museum, she took on the pseudonym Portsmouth. A National Historic Landmark, she is one of a small number of surviving lightships.

== History ==
Lightship Portsmouth (LV-101) was built in 1915 by Pusey & Jones. She first served as Charles in the Chesapeake Bay outside Cape Charles, Virginia from 1916 until 1924. After that assignment Portsmouth served just over a year as the relief ship for other lightships in her district. She was then moved to Overfalls, Delaware, where she was stationed from 1926 to 1951 as Overfalls. In 1939 when the United States Lighthouse Service was absorbed into the United States Coast Guard she was reclassified WAL-524, but still kept a station name on her hull. During World War II the vessel was not armed, however many other lightships were. In 1951 LV-101/WAL 524 was reassigned to Stonehorse Shoal, Massachusetts, where she served until decommissioned in 1963. The lightship then sat in harbor at Portland, Maine, until her fate had been decided.

On 3 September 1964, LV-101 was donated to the City of Portsmouth, Virginia, to become a part of the Portsmouth Naval Shipyard Museum. Portsmouth was dry docked at the London Pier in Portsmouth. Although she was never stationed there, she has taken on the city's name. In 1989, Portsmouth was designated a National Historic Landmark and is open for visitation.

== Name and station assignments ==
Lightship are numbered, the stations have names. Light Vessel 101 was assigned to the stations:

- Charles, Cape Charles, Virginia (1916–1924)
- Relief, Relief 5th District (1925–1926)
- Overfalls, Overfalls, Delaware (1926–1951)
- Stonehorse, Stonehorse Shoal, Massachusetts (1951–1963)
- CrossRip, Cross Rip Shoal, Massachusetts (1963–1964)

== Other lightships of Chesapeake Bay ==
- Lightship Chesapeake (LV-116)

== See also ==
- List of National Historic Landmarks in Virginia
- National Register of Historic Places listings in Portsmouth, Virginia
