= Monumental Methodist Church =

Historic church in Virginia, United States

- Monumental United Methodist Church
- U.S. National Register of Historic Places
- U.S. Historic district – Contributing property
- Virginia Landmarks Register
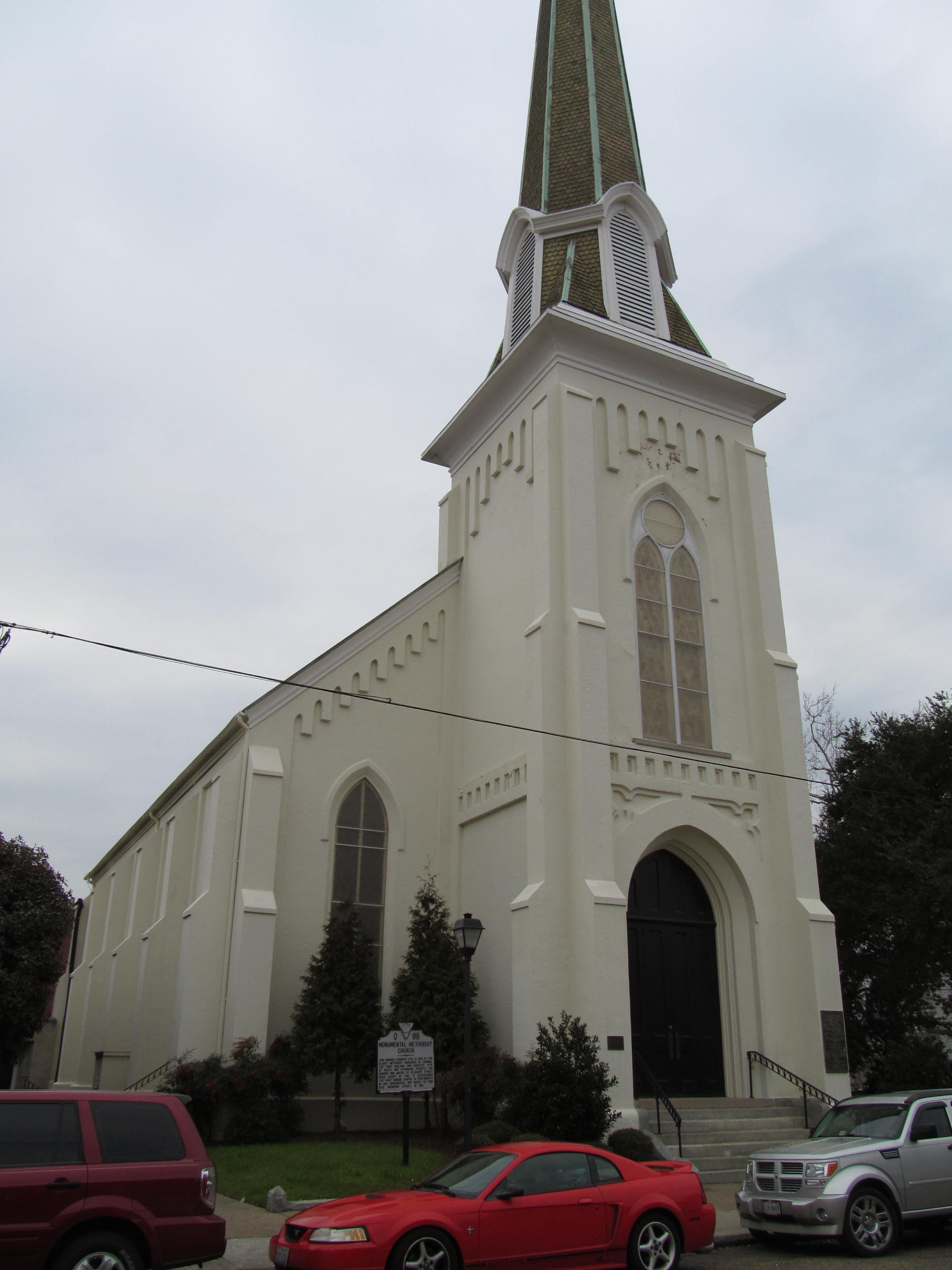
- Monumental Methodist Church

- Location within Virginia Location within the United States
- Location: 450 Dinwiddie St., Portsmouth, Virginia
- Coordinates: 36°50′9″N 76°18′10″W
- Area: 0.6 acres (0.24 ha)
- Built: 1874-1876
- Architect: West, Albert Lawrence
- Architectural style: Gothic
- NRHP reference No.: 03001430
- VLR No.: 124-0034-0039

Significant dates
- Added to NRHP: January 15, 2004
- Designated VLR: September 10, 2002

Monumental United Methodist Church, formerly known as Dinwiddie Street Methodist Church, is a historic Methodist church located in Portsmouth, Virginia. It is a five-bay brick and stucco, Victorian Gothic style church. It is features a 182 feet tall, two part central tower. The church was built between 1871 and 1876 on the foundations of an earlier 1831 building that had burned in 1864.

The church was heavily damaged by fire on January 3, 2018.

It was listed on the National Register of Historic Places in 2004. It is located in the Portsmouth Olde Towne Historic District.
