= Quarters A, B, and C, Norfolk Naval Shipyard =

Historic house in Virginia, United States

- U.S. National Register of Historic Places
- Virginia Landmarks Register
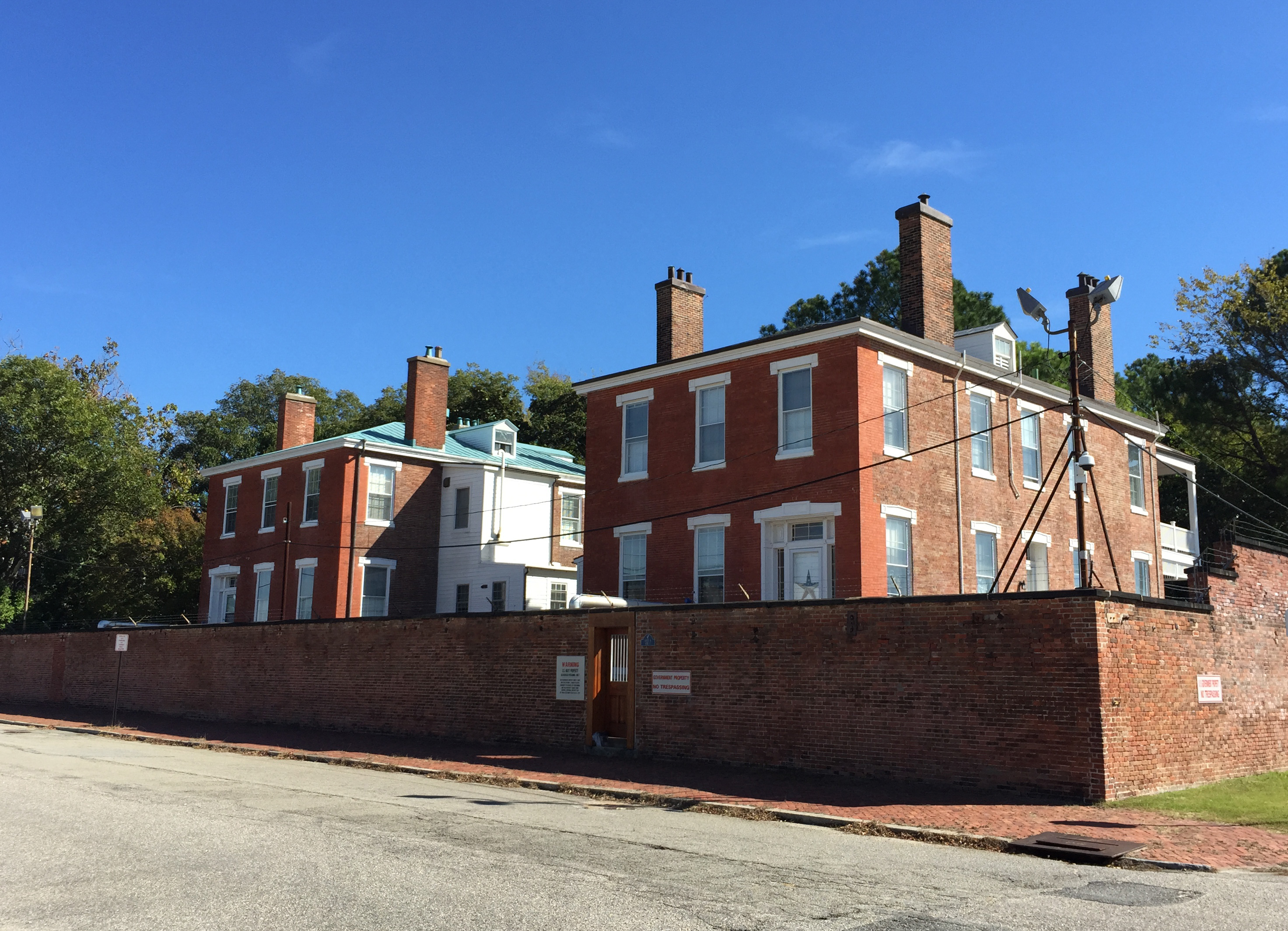
- Quarters B and C, 2015

- Location within Virginia Location within the United States
- Location: Norfolk Naval Shipyard, Portsmouth, Virginia
- Coordinates: 36°49′35″N 76°17′51″W
- Area: 3 acres (1.2 ha)
- Built: 1837
- Architectural style: Greek Revival
- NRHP reference No.: 74002242
- VLR No.: 124-0016

Significant dates
- Added to NRHP: December 19, 1974
- Designated VLR: November 19, 1974

Quarters A, B, and C, Norfolk Naval Shipyard are three historic officer's quarters located at the Norfolk Naval Shipyard in Portsmouth, Virginia. They were built about 1837, and are three Greek Revival style brick dwellings. Quarters A is the most formal and sits on a high basement and covered by a hipped roof with interior end chimneys. It features a central entry with Doric order pilasters, plain full entablature and blocking course. Its design is taken directly from Plate 28 of Asher Benjamin's The Practical House Carpenter (1830). Quarters B and C also sit on a high basement and covered by a hipped roof with interior end chimneys.

Quarters A, the residence of the shipyard's commanders, was extensively damaged by fire on 12 August 2014.

The residences were listed on the National Register of Historic Places in 1974.

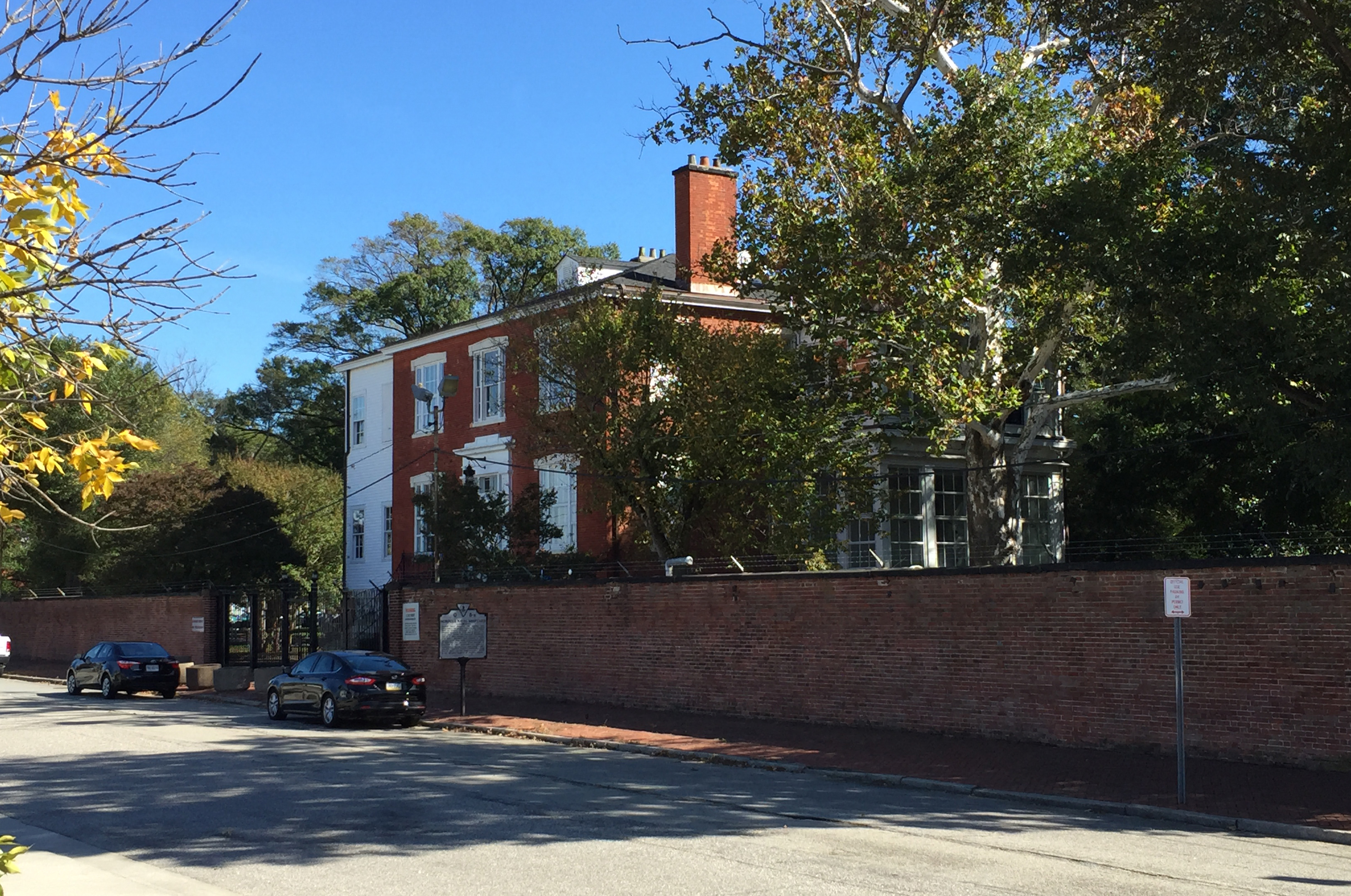
Quarters A, 2015
