= Portsmouth Courthouse =

Historic courthouse in Virginia, US

- U.S. National Register of Historic Places
- U.S. Historic district – Contributing property
- Virginia Landmarks Register
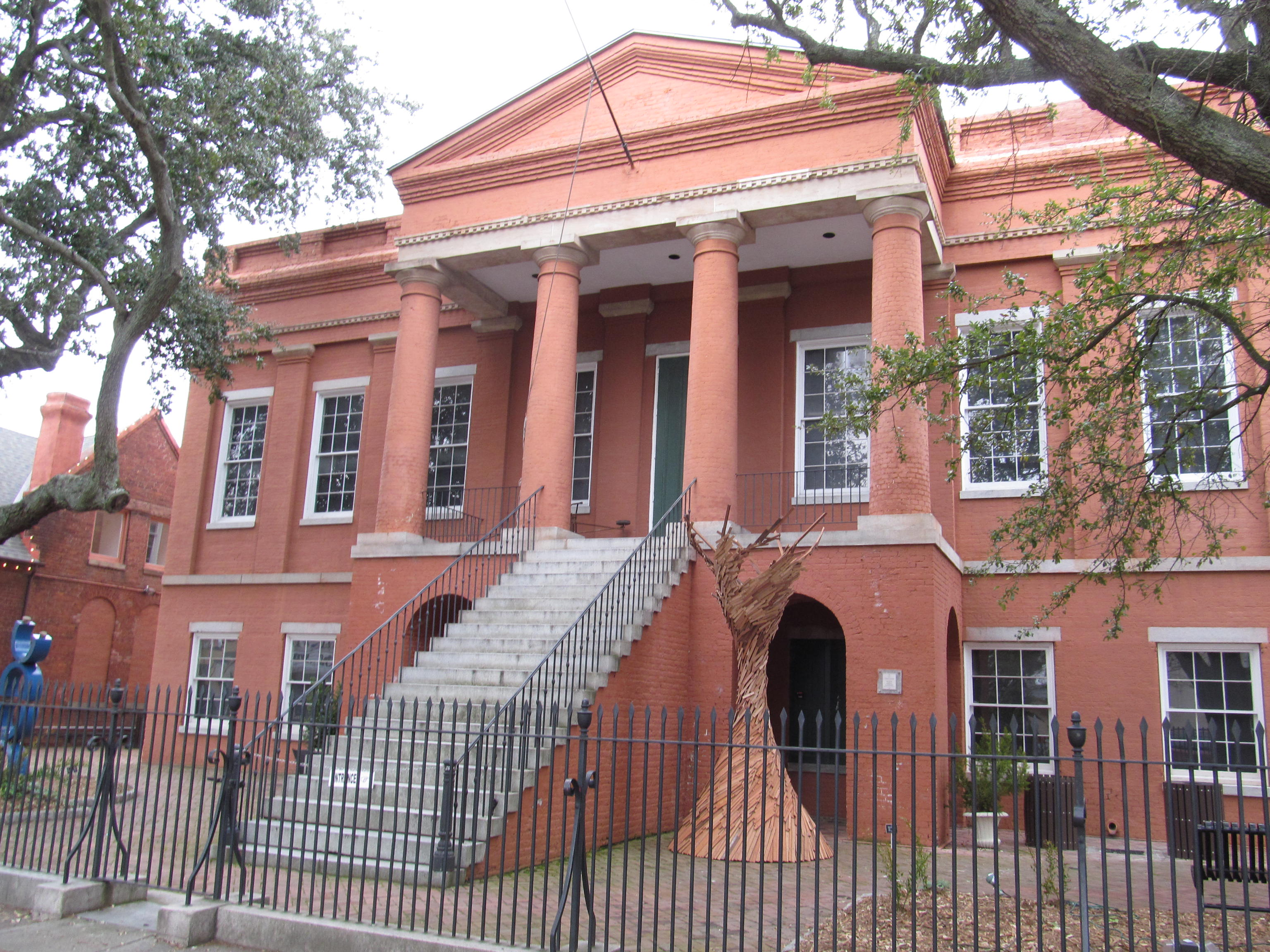
- Portsmouth Courthouse, now home to the Portsmouth Art & Cultural Center

- Location within Virginia Location within the United States
- Interactive map showing the location for Portsmouth Courthouse
- Location: NW corner of Court and High Sts., Portsmouth, Virginia
- Coordinates: 36°50′7″N 76°18′6″W
- Area: 1 acre (0.40 ha)
- Built: 1846
- Built by: Butler, Willoughby G.
- Architect: Singleton, William B.
- Architectural style: Greek Revival
- NRHP reference No.: 70000876
- VLR No.: 124-0006

Significant dates
- Added to NRHP: April 29, 1970
- Designated VLR: April 7, 1970

Portsmouth Courthouse, also known as Norfolk County Courthouse, is a historic courthouse building located at Portsmouth, Virginia, United States. It was built in 1846, and is a one-story with basement, Greek Revival-style brick building. It measures 78 feet wide by 57 feet deep. The building is topped by a paneled parapet with Doric order entablature supported by plain Greek Doric pilasters. The building remained in use as a courthouse until 1960, when the county government moved to Great Bridge.

It was listed on the National Register of Historic Places in April 7, 1970. It is located in the Downtown Portsmouth Historic District.

The building is an example of Greek Revival architecture, designed by William B. Singleton, with a lean Doric portico above a high basement and it now houses the Portsmouth Art & Cultural Centre.
