= Cedar Grove Cemetery (Portsmouth, Virginia) =

Historic cemetery

- U.S. National Register of Historic Places
- Virginia Landmarks Register
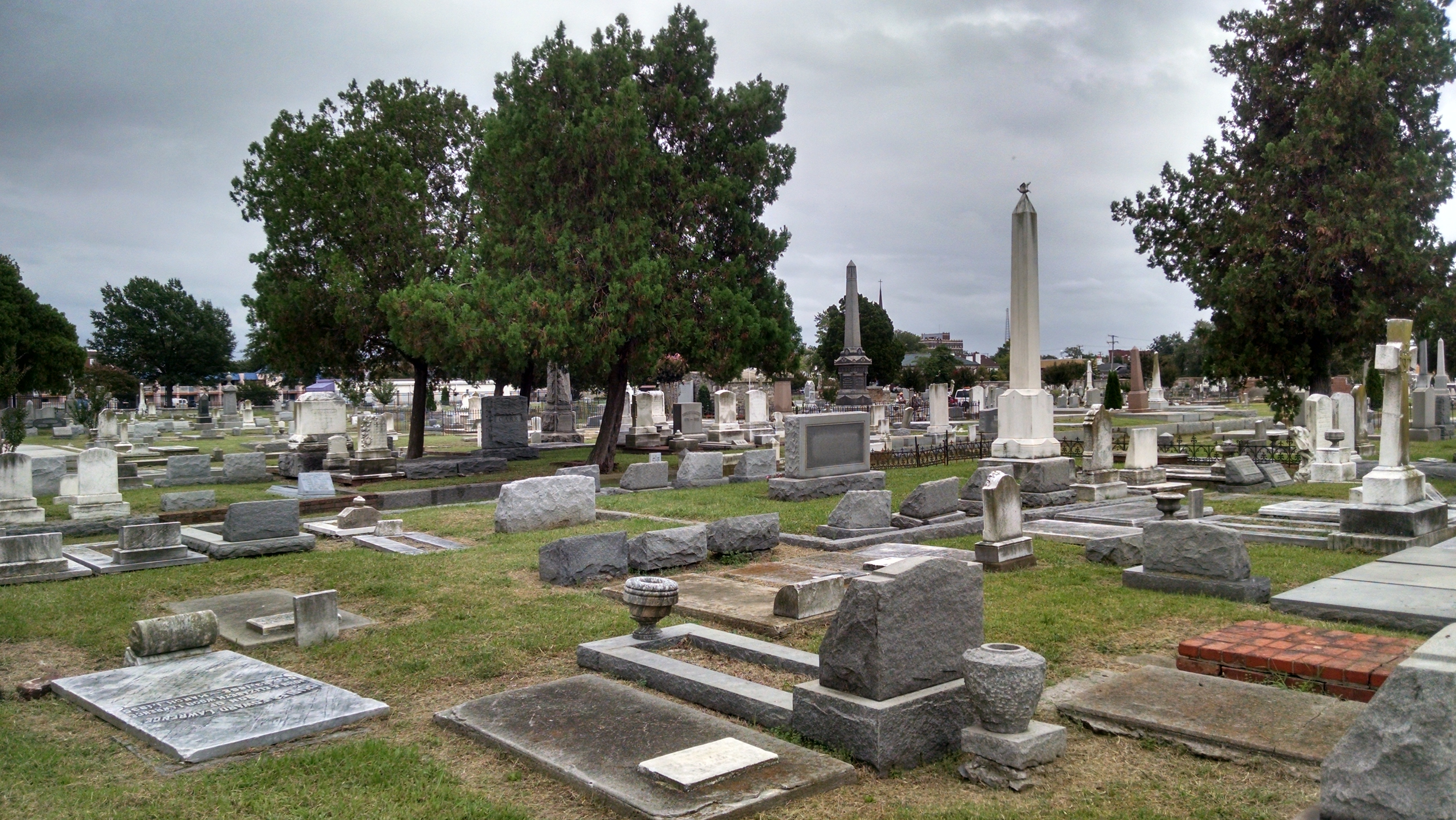

- Location within Virginia Location within the United States
- Location: 301 Fort Ln., Portsmouth, Virginia
- Coordinates: 36°50′20″N 76°18′28″W
- Area: 5.3 acres (2.1 ha)
- Architect: Anderson, William A.; Butt & Hodges
- Architectural style: Greek Revival, Late Victorian, Exotic Revival
- NRHP reference No.: 92001366
- VLR No.: 124-0058

Significant dates
- Added to NRHP: October 15, 1992
- Designated VLR: June 19, 1991

Cedar Grove Cemetery is a historic public cemetery located at Portsmouth, Virginia. It was established by an act of the Virginia General Assembly in 1832. The cemetery contains more than 400 graves with monuments dating from the late 1700s to the present. Its memorial markers include small tablets, ledger stones, obelisks, columnar monuments and mausoleums. They include notable examples of Greek Revival, Late Victorian, and Exotic Revival funerary art.

It was listed on the National Register of Historic Places in 1992.

== Notable burials and monuments ==
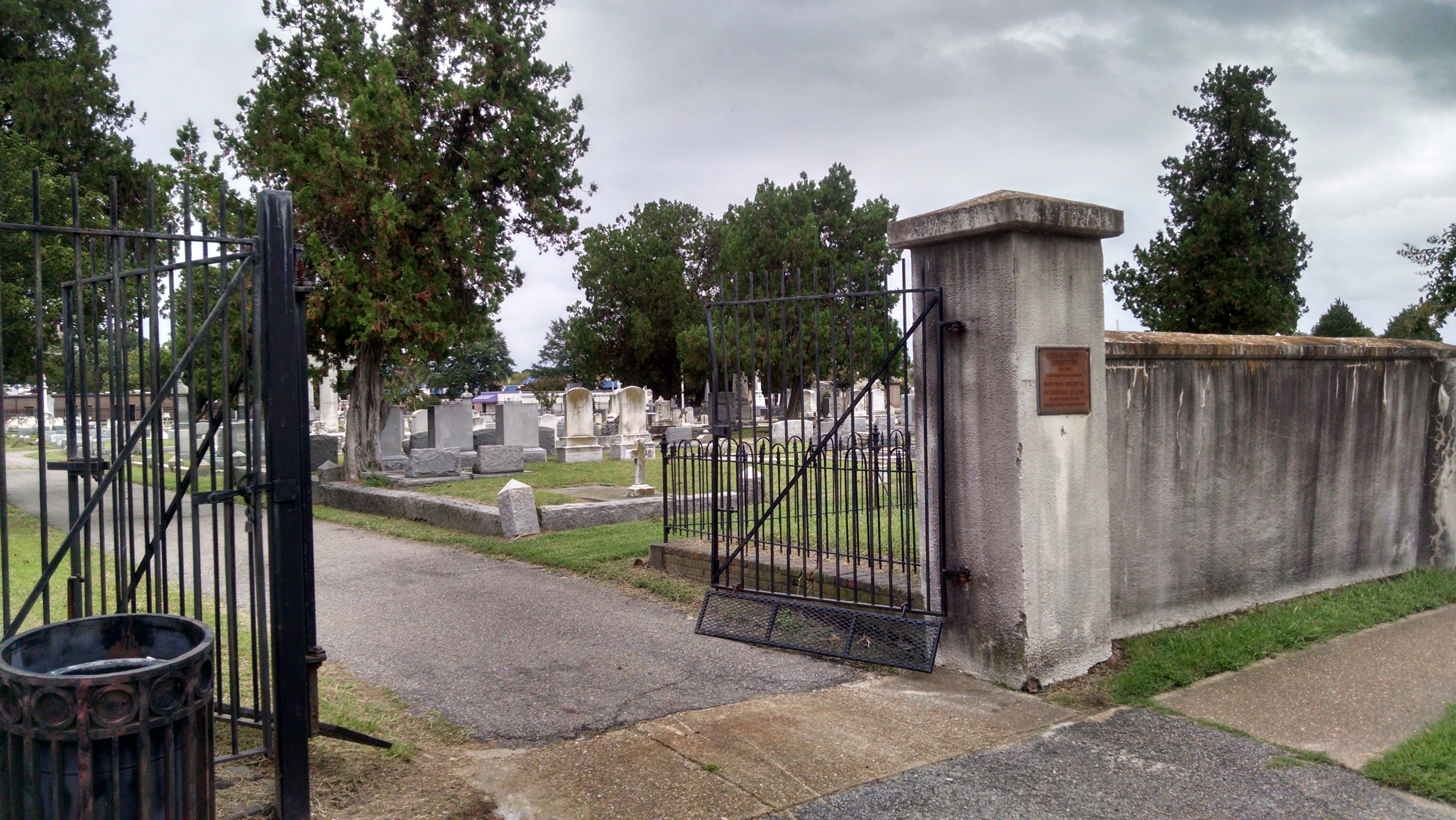
The entrance to the cemetery

- Charles E. Cassell (1838–1916) – Architect and a founding member of the Baltimore Chapter of the American Institute of Architects
- James Chisholm (1815–1855) – Episcopal priest who died helping the community through an epidemic of yellow fever, leaving behind a historic draft memoir
- James W. Cooke (1812–1869) – Naval officer in the U.S. Navy and the Confederate Navy, overseer of the construction of the ironclad ram CSS Albemarle
- Archibald C. Godwin (1831–1864) – Brigadier general in the Confederate States Army who died at the Third Battle of Winchester (monument only, buried at Stonewall Cemetery in Winchester, Virginia)
- George Marshall - U.S. Navy Master Gunner fought in War of 1812 and wrote Marshall's Practical Marine Gunnery
- William H. Murdaugh – Passed Midshipman, acting master and first officer of the First Grinnell Expedition to investigate the fate of the lost Franklin Polar Expedition
- Charles Francis Nash (died 1942) – a Leading Aircraftman for the Royal Canadian Air Force in World War II (the only Commonwealth war grave at the site).
- George Pickett (1825–1875) – Major general in the Confederate States Army who led the assault known as Pickett's Charge at the Battle of Gettysburg (later disinterred and reburied at the Hollywood Cemetery in Richmond, Virginia).
- Grace Phillips Pollard (1873–1932) – wife of Virginia governor John Garland Pollard
- John L. Porter (1813–1893) – civilian employee of the U.S. Navy and the Confederate Navy, designer of the ironclad warship, the CSS Virginia
