= Norfolk Naval Shipyard =

US Navy shipyard in Virginia

Coordinates: 36°48′55″N 76°17′50″W

- Portsmouth, Virginia
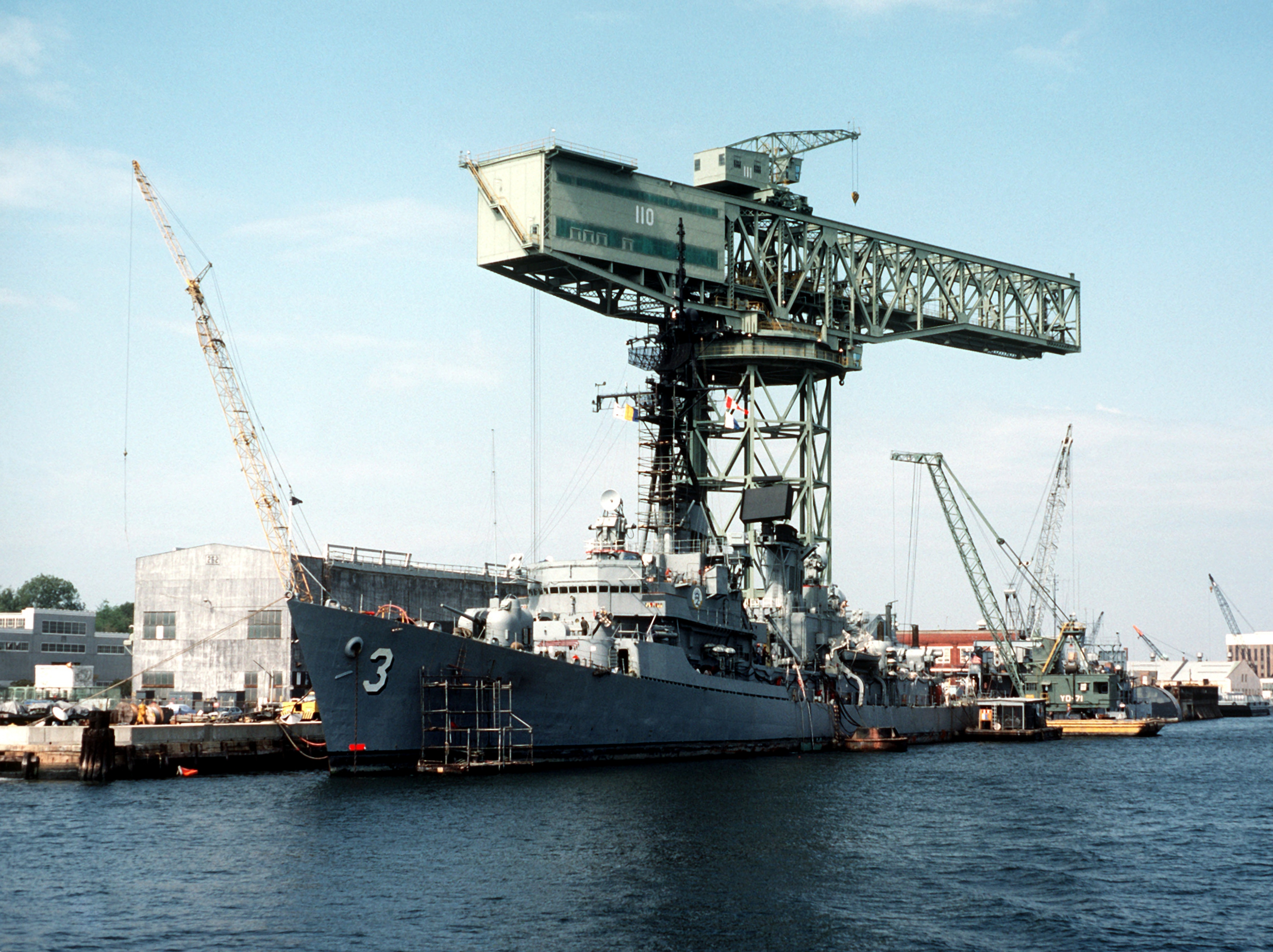
- The 350-ton hammerhead crane at Norfolk Naval Shipyard

Site information
- Type: Shipyard
- Controlled by: United States Navy

Site history
- Built: 1767 as Gosport Shipyard (Royal Navy) current name since 1862 (U.S. Navy)
- In use: 1767–present

Garrison information
- Current commander: Rear Admiral Kavon "Hak" Hakimzadeh (August 2025–present)

The Norfolk Naval Shipyard, often called the Norfolk Navy Yard and abbreviated as NNSY, is a U.S. Navy facility in Portsmouth, Virginia. It was created for building, remodeling and repairing the United States Navy's ships. It is the oldest and largest industrial facility that belongs to the U.S. Navy as well as the most comprehensive. Located on the Elizabeth River, the yard is just a short distance upriver from its mouth at Hampton Roads.

It was established as Gosport Shipyard in 1767. Though it was destroyed during the American Revolutionary War, it was rebuilt and became home to the first operational drydock in the United States in the 1830s. Changing hands during the American Civil War, it served the Confederate States Navy until it was again destroyed in 1862, when it was given its current name. The shipyard was again rebuilt, and has continued to operate through the present day.

== History ==
=== British control ===
The Gosport Shipyard was founded on November 1, 1767, by Andrew Sprowle on the western shore of the Elizabeth River in Norfolk County in the Virginia colony. This shipyard became a prosperous naval and merchant facility for the British Crown. In 1775, at the beginning of the American Revolution, Sprowle stayed loyal to the Crown which confiscated all of his properties, including the shipyard. Following Governor Dunmore's retreat from Portsmouth in May 1776, Sprowle was exiled along with other Royalists to Gwynn's Island (now Mathews County, Virginia), where he died 29 May 1776 and was buried in an unmarked grave. In 1779, while the newly formed Commonwealth of Virginia was operating the shipyard, it was burned by British forces during the Chesapeake raid.

=== American control ===
In 1794, United States Congress passed "An Act to Provide a Naval Armament," allowing the Federal Government to lease the Gosport Shipyard from Virginia. In 1799 the keel of USS Chesapeake, one of the first six frigates authorized by Congress, was laid, making her the first ship built in Gosport for the U.S. Navy.

The federal government purchased the shipyard from Virginia in 1801 for $12,000. This tract of land measured 16 acres (65,000 m^{2}) and now makes up the northeastern corner of the current shipyard. In 1827, construction began on the first of what would be the first two dry docks in the United States. The first one was completed three weeks ahead of similar projects in both Boston and South America, making it the first functional dry dock in the Americas. Dry Dock One, as it is referred to today, is still operational and is listed as historical landmark in Portsmouth, Virginia. Officer's Quarters A, B, and C were built about 1837. Additional land on the eastern side of the Elizabeth River was purchased in 1845.

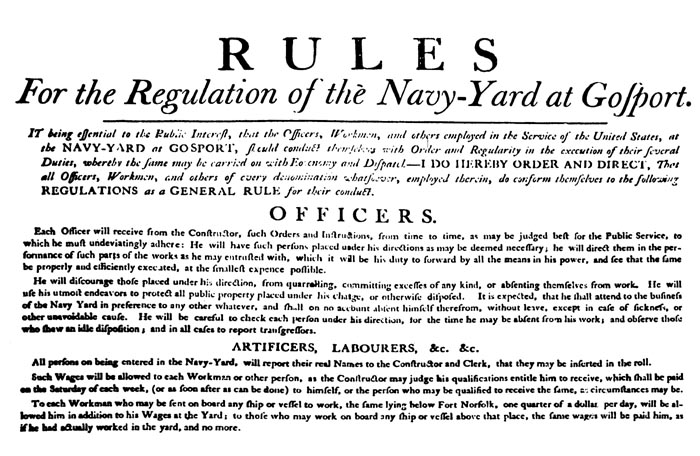
These regulations for the operation of the Gosport [Norfolk] Navy Yard were composed by Josiah Fox, Navy Constructor and Superintendent Gosport Navy Yard 1800

The shipyard and neighboring towns suffered from a severe yellow fever epidemic in 1855, which killed about a quarter of the population, including James Chisholm, whose account was published shortly after his death in the epidemic.

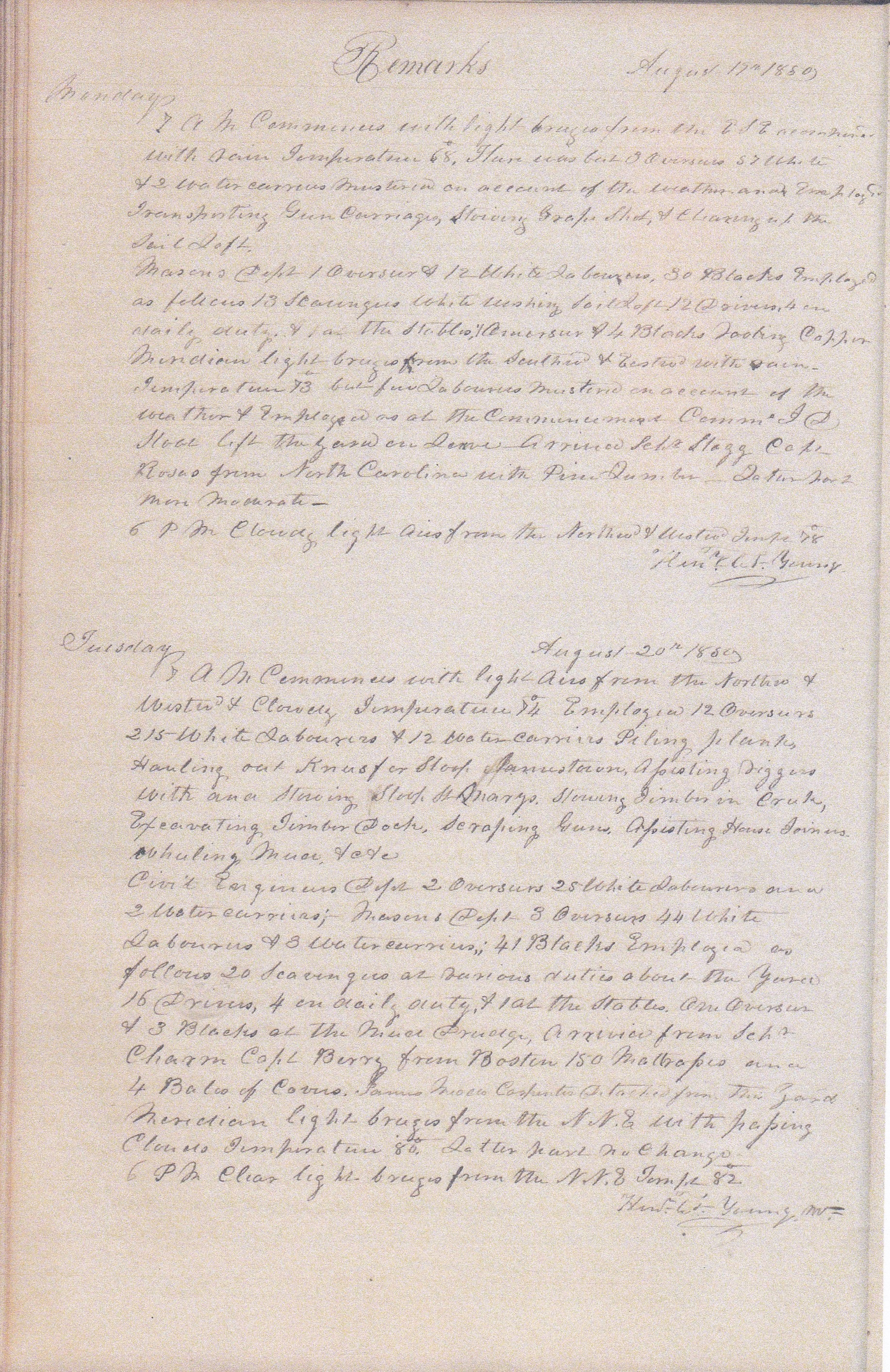
United States Navy, Norfolk Naval Shipyard, station log, entries,19-20 August 1850.The Log provided a record of weather data, daily work assignments for white and black employees, naval and commercial vessels entering and departing shipyard. Black employees during the antebellum era were often enslaved laborers.

=== Enslaved labor ===
Enslaved labor was extensively utilized in the Norfolk Navy Yard from its foundation until the Civil War. An example of such use is found in Norfolk Navy Yard Commandant, Commodore John Cassin's letter to the Secretary of the Navy, Benjamin W. Crowninshield. Cassin began his letter, by stating as justification "Finding it absolutely impossible to do the labor required in this Yard, without taking in some black men in consequence of the white men sporting with their time in the manner they do, leaving the yard, since the month of April come in, there has Sixty four men, laborers left the yard, some gone to Old Point to work where greater wages is given and others gone to sea... I have therefore taken in twenty four blacks for the purpose of discharging & loading such vessels as may be ordered and cleaning the frigate Constitution's hold." Some idea of the human scale can be found in this excerpt from a letter of Commodore Lewis Warrington dated 12 October 1831 to the Board of Navy Commissioners (BNC). Warrington's letter to the BNC was in response to various petitions by white workers to curtail or end enslaved labor on the Dry Dock. His letter attempts both to reassure the BNC in light of Nat Turner's Rebellion which occurred on 22 August 1831 and to serve as a reply to the Dry Dock's stonemasons who had quit their positions and accused the project chief engineer, Loammi Baldwin Jr., of the unfair hiring of enslaved labor in their stead.

There are about two hundred and forty six blacks employed in the Yard and Dock altogether; of whom one hundred and thirty six are in the former and one hundred ten in the latter – We shall in the Course of this day or tomorrow discharge twenty which will leave but one hundred and twenty six on our roll – The evil of employing blacks, if it be one, is in a fair and rapid course of diminution, as our whole number, after the timber now in the water is stowed, will not exceed sixty; and those employed at the Dock will be discharged from time to time, as their services can be dispensed with – when it is finished, there will be no occasion for the employment of any.

Despite such promises, enslaved labor continued, and, as of October 1832, Baldwin reported of the 261 men employed on the Dry Dock, 78 of whom, were enslaved black laborers or 30% of the Dry Dock workforce. Opposition to enslaved labor was never able to effectively challenge the status quo and suggestions or recommendations to end the practice met fierce resistance. One such effort in 1839, was countered by a petition signed by 34 shipyard slaveholders, pleading with the Secretary of the Navy to continue it less they suffer economic harm. Their successful petition was endorsed by Commodore Lewis Warrington. Warrington noted: "I beg leave to state, that no slave employed in this yard, is owned by a commissioned officer, but that many are owned by the Master Mechanicks & workmen of the yard". He added; “I beg leave to state, that no slave is allowed to perform any mechanical work in the yard, all such being necessarily reserved for the whites; this keeping up the proper distinction between the white men & slave”. In 1846 Commodore Jesse Wilkerson felt the need to confirm the continuation of slave hiring to the Secretary of the Navy George Bancroft, “that a majority of them [blacks] are negro slaves, and that a large portion of those employed in the Ordinary for many years, have been of that description, but by what authority I am unable to say as nothing can be found in the records of my office on the subject – These men have been examined by the Surgeon of the Yard and regularly Shipped [enlisted] for twelve months"

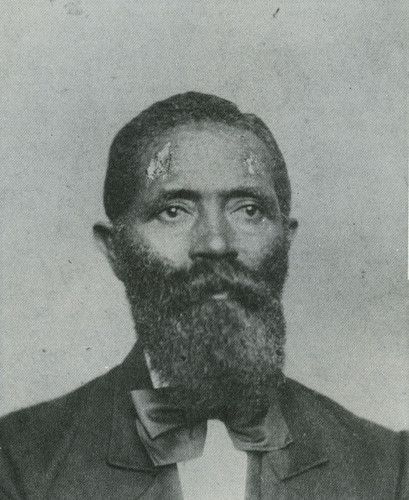
George Teamoh 1818 to after 1887. George Teamoh worked at Norfolk Navy Yard as an enslaved laborer and ship caulker in the 1830s and 1840s (LOC photo)

George Teamoh (1818–1883) as a young enslaved laborer and ship caulker worked at Norfolk Navy Yard in the 1830s and 1840s and later wrote of this unrequited toil: "The government had patronized, and given encouragement to slavery to a greater extent than the great majority of the country has been aware. It had in its service hundreds if not thousands of slaves employed on government works." As late "as 1848 almost one third of the 300 workers at the Gosport (Norfolk) Navy Yard were hired slaves."

=== American Civil War ===
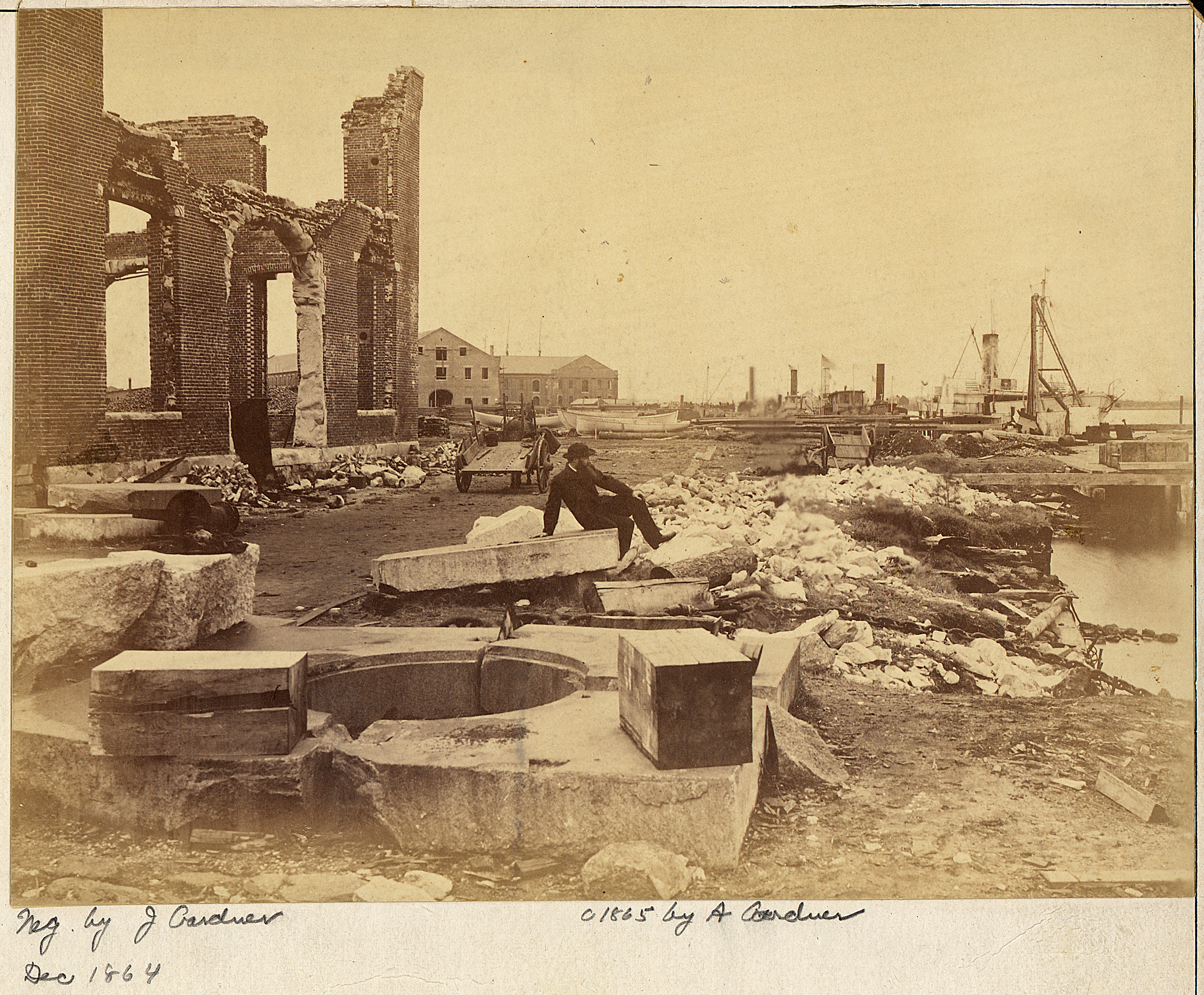
Ruins of the shipyard after the Civil War, 1864; photo by James Gardner. From the collection of the National Archives and Records Administration.

In 1861, Virginia joined the Confederate States of America. Fearing that the Confederacy would take control of the facility, the shipyard commander Charles Stewart McCauley ordered the burning of the shipyard on 21 April 1861. The Confederate forces did, in fact, take over the shipyard, and did so without armed conflict through an elaborate ruse orchestrated by civilian railroad builder William Mahone (then President of the Norfolk and Petersburg Railroad and soon to become a famous Confederate officer). He bluffed the Federal troops into abandoning the shipyard in Portsmouth by running a single passenger train into Norfolk with great noise and whistle-blowing, then much more quietly, sending it back west, and then returning the same train again, creating the illusion of large numbers of arriving troops to the Federals listening in Portsmouth across the Elizabeth River (and just barely out of sight). The capture of the shipyard allowed a tremendous amount of war material to fall into Confederate hands. 1,195 heavy guns were taken for the defense of the Confederacy, and employed in many areas from Hampton Roads all the way to Fort Donelson Tennessee, Port Hudson, and Fort DeRussy, Louisiana. The Union forces withdrew to Fort Monroe across Hampton Roads, which was the only land in the area which remained under Union control.

In early 1862, the Confederate ironclad warship CSS Virginia was rebuilt using the burned-out hulk of USS Merrimack. In the haste to abandon the shipyard, Merrimack had only been destroyed above the waterline, and an innovative armored superstructure was built upon the remaining portion. Virginia, which was still called Merrimack by Union forces and in many historical accounts, sank USS Cumberland, USS Congress, and engaged the Union ironclad USS Monitor in the famous Battle of Hampton Roads during the Union blockade of Hampton Roads. The Confederates burned the shipyard again when they left in May 1862.

Following its recapture of Norfolk and Portsmouth (and the shipyard) by the Union forces, the name of the shipyard was changed to Norfolk after the county in which it was located, outside the city limits of Portsmouth at the time. This choice of name was probably to minimize any confusion with the pre-existing Portsmouth Naval Shipyard in Kittery, Maine, near Portsmouth, New Hampshire.

=== Modern shipyard ===
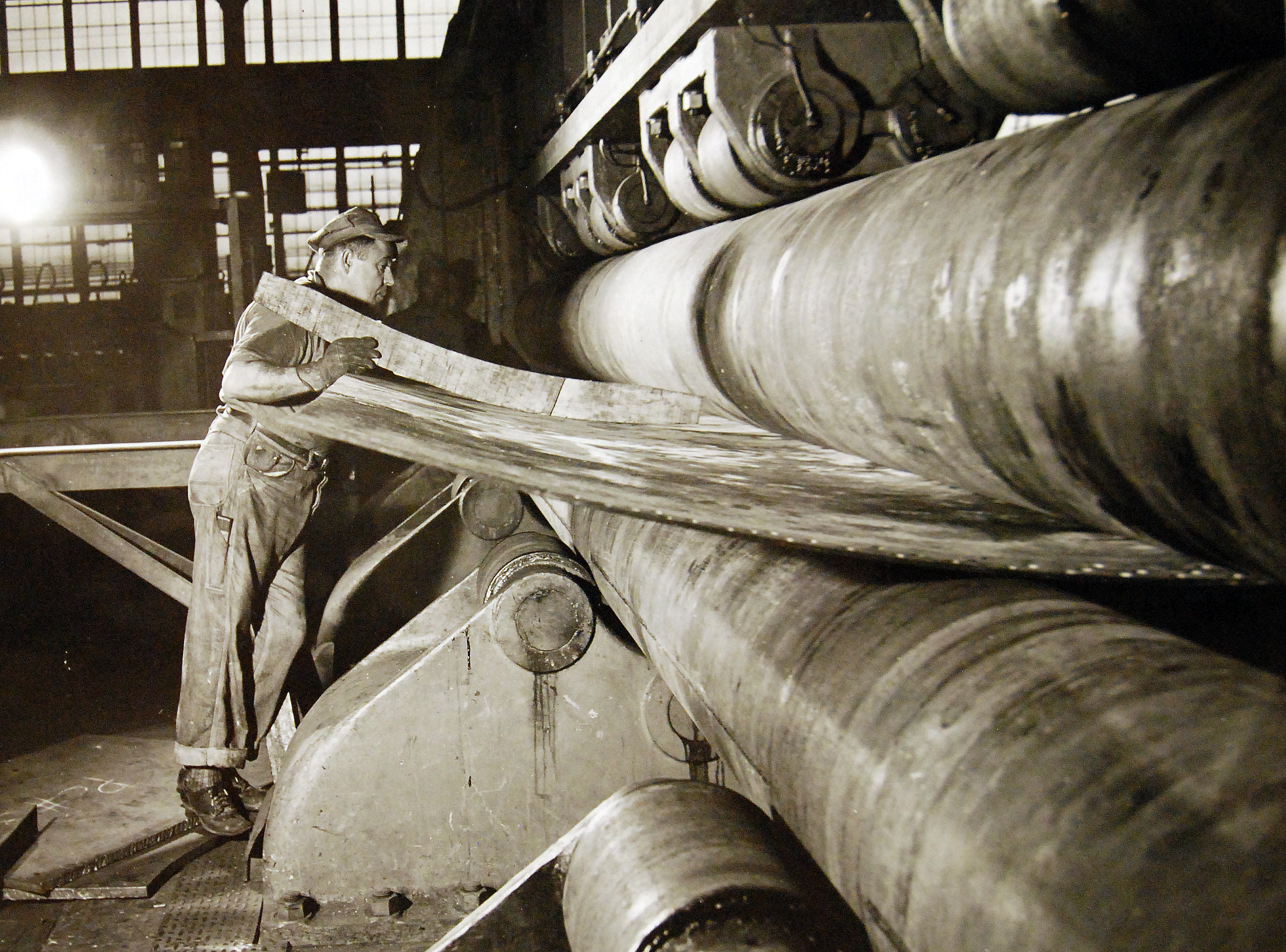
Shaping a ship's plate in October 1941

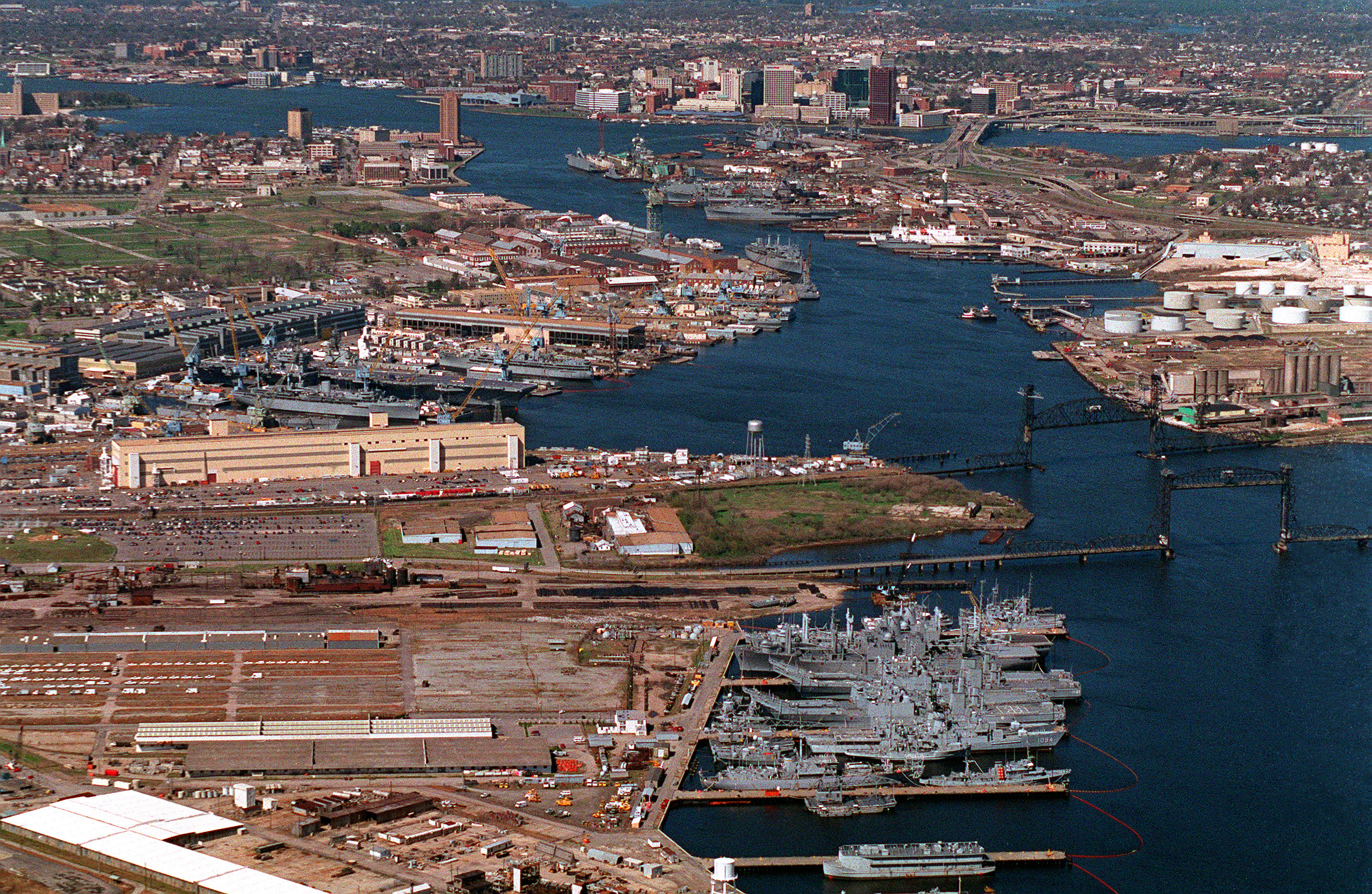
Aerial view of the shipyard looking north towards Norfolk

From the Reconstruction Era until 1917, the shipyard was used both for ship repair and construction and for ship stationing. The current major naval base for the region, Naval Station Norfolk, did not yet exist. As such, the then Norfolk Navy Yard served as the official Homeport for ships stationed in the Hampton Roads region.

No major expansion occurred at the facility until World War I when it was expanded to accommodate 11,000 employees and their families. The shipyard was again expanded during World War II, doubling its physical size and greatly expanding its productive capacity. During its peak from 1940 to 1945, 43,000 personnel were employed and 6,850 vessels were repaired.

After World War II, the shipyard shifted from being a ship construction facility to an overhaul and repair facility. Work on the Iowa-class battleship, Kentucky was suspended in 1950. Its last two ships, Bold and her sister ship, Bulwark, wooden minesweepers, were christened on March 28, 1953, during the Korean War.

Currently, the shipyard is composed of several noncontiguous areas, totaling 1,275 acres (5.16 km^{2}). From 1992 to 1993, the Norfolk Naval Shipyard had an issue with pollution, stemming from discharges from the dry dock. This pollution resulted in a Consent Special Order by the State of Virginia demanding it to achieve compliance. Norfolk Naval Shipyard provides repair and modernization services for every type of ship that the U.S. Navy has in service, which includes amphibious vessels, submarines, guided-missile cruisers, and supercarriers, although in recent years the shipyard has primarily focused on nuclear ships and nuclear support ships. The Norfolk yard is one of the few facilities on the East Coast capable of dry docking nuclear aircraft carriers. Another facility capable of drydocking such carriers is Huntington Ingalls Industries (HII), located on the opposite side of Hampton Roads in Newport News, which is the only U.S. shipyard that currently builds and refuels nuclear aircraft carriers.

== Dry docks and slipways ==
Dock No.	Material of which dock is constructed	Length	Width	Depth	Date Completed	Source
1	Granite	325 feet 4 inches (99.16 m)	86 feet 3 inches (26.29 m)	25 feet 8 inches (7.82 m)	1833	
2	Concrete	496 feet 3 inches (151.26 m)	106 feet 10 inches (32.56 m)	37 feet 5 inches (11.40 m)	1966	
3	Concrete and granite	726 feet (221 m)	123 feet (37 m)	34 feet 7 inches (10.54 m)	1911	
4	Concrete	1,010 feet 7 inches (308.03 m)	144 feet (44 m)	44 feet 2 inches (13.46 m)	1919	
6*	Concrete	459 feet (140 m)	76 feet 8 inches (23.37 m)	20 feet 5 inches (6.22 m)	1919	
7*	Concrete	459 feet (140 m)	76 feet 8 inches (23.37 m)	20 feet 5 inches (6.22 m)	1919	
8	Concrete	1,092 feet 5 inches (332.97 m)	150 feet (46 m)	47 feet 11 inches (14.61 m)	1942	
8	Concrete	1,161 feet (354 m)**	150 feet (46 m)	47 feet 11 inches (14.61 m)	1942	

^{* Dry Docks have since been filled in and no longer exist.}

^{** Lengthened in 2011 to accommodate carriers after CVN-75 with bulbous bows.}

January 1, 1946
Shipbuilding ways	Width	Length	Source
1	120 feet (37 m)	910 feet (280 m)	
2	40 feet (12 m)	375 feet (114 m)	

== Notable ships ==
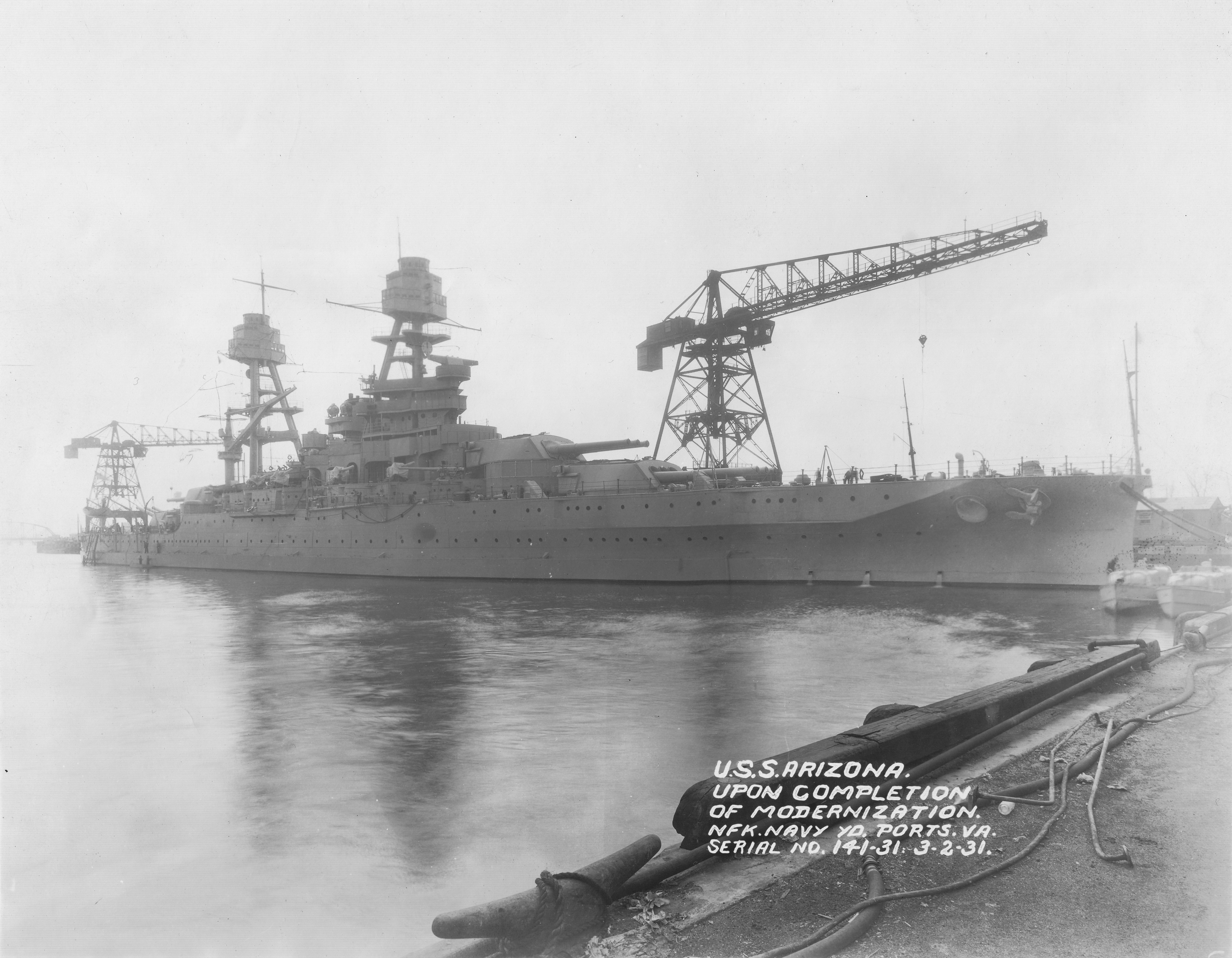
USS Arizona during a refit at Norfolk Naval Shipyard in 1931

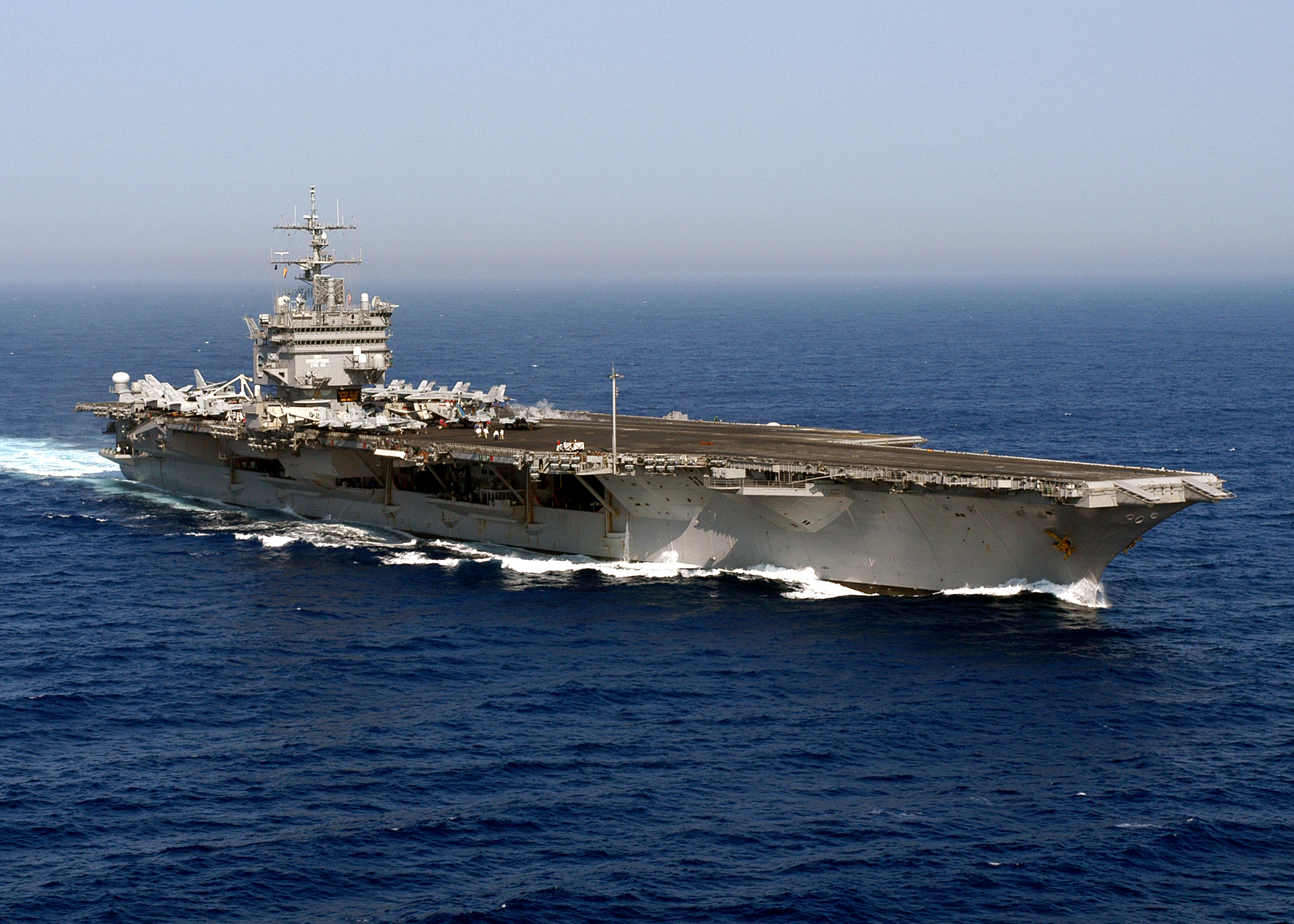
USS Enterprise

- USS Chesapeake – 38-gun frigate, contemporary to USS Constitution, fought in the War of 1812.
- USS Delaware – a 74-gun ship of the line, launched in 1820.
- CSS Virginia – First Confederate ironclad warship, rebuilt from burned out hulk of USS Merrimack; participant in Battle of Hampton Roads against USS Monitor
- USS Texas – First U.S. naval battleship to be commissioned.
- USS Raleigh – First modern cruiser completely built by the U.S. government.
- USS Langley – First U.S. aircraft carrier; converted from USS Jupiter.
- USS Arizona – Modernization completed in 1931.
- USS Idaho – Modernization completed in 1934.
- USS Mississippi – Modernization completed in 1933.
- USS Nevada – Modernization completed in 1930.
- USS New York – Modernization completed in 1928.
- USS Texas – Modernization completed in 1926, survives as a museum ship in San Jacinto, Texas.
- USS Shangri-La – Only U.S. aircraft carrier paid for solely by U.S. Warbonds and subscriptions, launched 24 February 1944.
- USS Lake Champlain – Built and launched 2 November 1944.
- USS Tarawa – Built and launched 12 May 1945.
- USS Alabama – Built and launched 16 February 1942.
- USS Enterprise, longest naval ship in the world, and world's first nuclear powered aircraft carrier. (Ship was built at Newport News Shipyard)

== Museum ==
Outside the facility on the nearby Old Town Portsmouth waterfront is the Portsmouth Naval Shipyard Museum, which features displays and artifacts from its history.

== See also ==
- Rear Admiral Walter McLean, commander of the Shipyard during World War I
- John H. Burroughs, superintendent of the Shipyard during the Union occupation of the American Civil War
- Norfolk Naval Shipyard South Gate Annex

== Bibliography ==
- Wright, Christopher C. (June 2021). "Question 1/58: Concerning Cement Backing for Armor on Montana (BB-67) Class Battleships". Warship International. LVIII (2): 118–120. ISSN 0043-0374.
