= Downtown Portsmouth Historic District =

Historic district in Virginia, United States

- U.S. National Register of Historic Places
- U.S. Historic district
- Virginia Landmarks Register
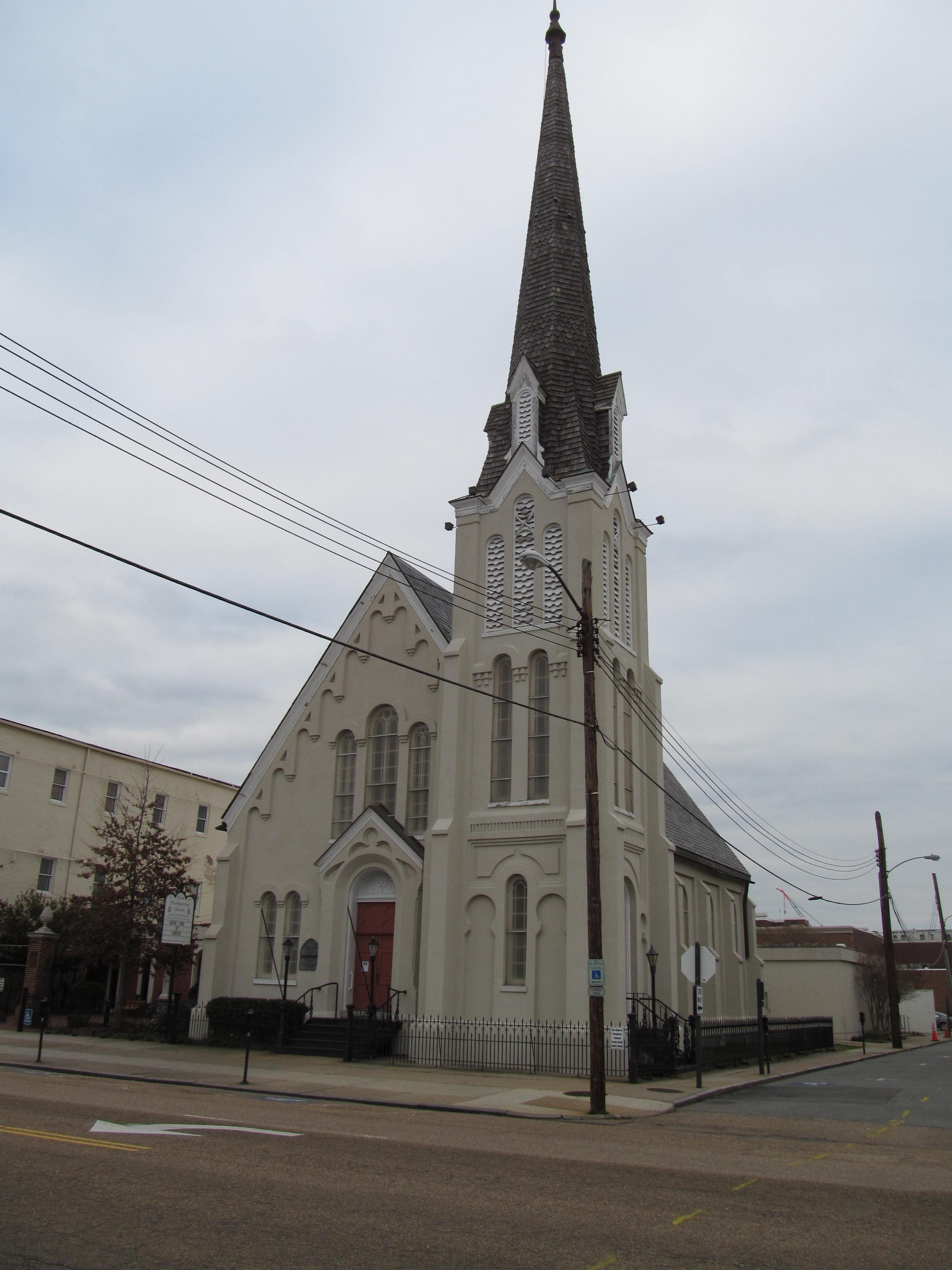
- First Presbyterian Church

- Location within Virginia Location within the United States
- Interactive map showing the location for Downtown Portsmouth Historic District
- Location: Roughly bounded by I-264, Middle St., Primrose St. and Queen St., Portsmouth, Virginia
- Coordinates: 36°50′09″N 76°18′19″W
- Area: 97 acres (39 ha)
- Built: 1752
- Architect: Cassell, Charles; et al.
- Architectural style: Late Victorian, Late 19th And 20th Century Revivals
- NRHP reference No.: 03001485 (original); 100013534 (increase)
- VLR No.: 124-5063

Significant dates
- Added to NRHP: January 16, 2004
- Boundary increase: October 15, 2026
- Designated VLR: September 11, 2002

Downtown Portsmouth Historic District, also known as the High Street Corridor Historic District, is a national historic district located at Portsmouth, Virginia. It encompasses 229 contributing buildings, 1 contributing site, 4 contributing structures, and 1 contributing object in the central business district of Portsmouth. The district encompasses the original 1752 plan of the Town of Portsmouth and includes portions of expansions of the original boundaries dating to 1763 and 1909. It includes a variety of commercial, government, and institutional buildings, with most dating to the years around the turn of the 20th century. Notable buildings include the Captain Baird House, Vermillion Manor (1840), City Hall Building (1878), former United States Post Office (1907-1908), First Presbyterian Church (1877), First United Methodist Churches (1882), St. James Episcopal Church, Ebenezer Baptist Church, YMCA building, Tidewater Building, Southern Aid Building, Colony Theater, Lyric Theater, Blumberg's Department Store, Mutual Drug Company (1946), the New Kirn Building, and the Professional Building. Separately listed are the Commodore Theatre, Portsmouth Courthouse, Pythian Castle, St. Paul's Catholic Church, and Trinity Episcopal Church

It was listed on the National Register of Historic Places in 2004.
