= USS Delaware (1820) =

74-gun ship of the line

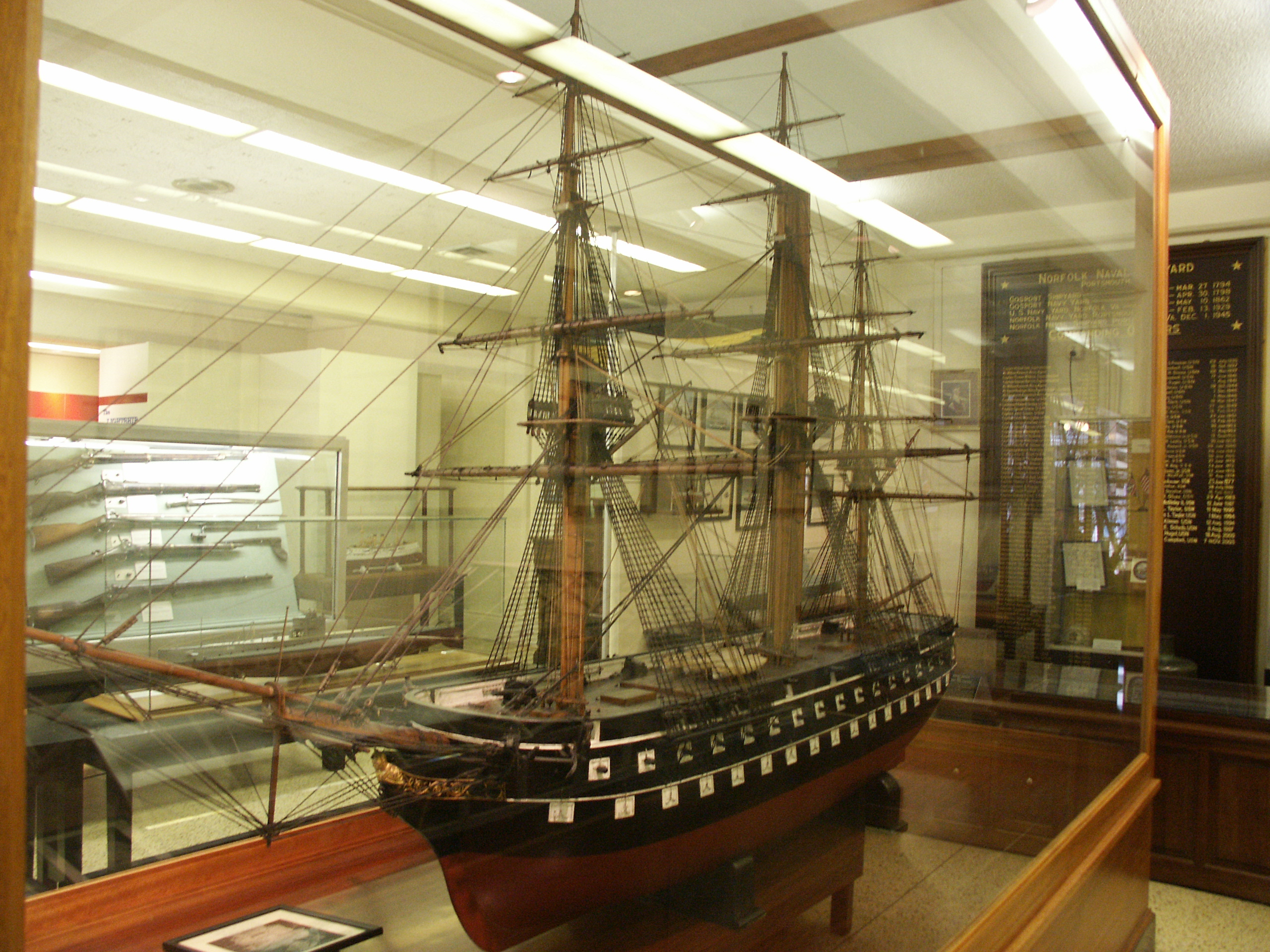
- Model of USS Delaware

History

United States
- Name: USS Delaware
- Builder: Norfolk Navy Yard
- Laid down: August 1817
- Launched: 21 October 1820
- Commissioned: before 10 February 1828
- Decommissioned: before 22 March 1844
- Fate: Burned 20 April 1861

General characteristics
- Type: Ship of the line
- Tonnage: 2633
- Length: 196 ft 2 in (59.79 m)
- Beam: 53 ft (16 m)
- Draft: 26 ft 2 in (7.98 m)
- Propulsion: Sail
- Complement: 820 officers and men
- Armament: 30 × long 32-pounder guns; 32 × medium 32-pounder guns; 2 × 32-pounder carronades

The third USS Delaware of the United States Navy was a 74-gun ship of the line, named for the state of Delaware.

She was laid down at Norfolk Navy Yard in August 1817 and launched on 21 October 1820. She was roofed over and kept at the yard in ordinary until on 27 March 1827, when she was ordered repaired and fitted for sea.

Delaware put to sea on 10 February 1828 under the command of Captain J. Downs to become the flagship of Commodore W. M. Crane in the Mediterranean. Arriving at Algeciras Bay, Spain on 23 March, she served in the interests of American commerce and diplomacy in that area until returning to Norfolk on 2 January 1830. According to Ned Myers, who shipped on her maiden voyage, "...it required some little time to get her trim and sailing. She turned out, however, to be a good vessel; sailing fairly, steering well, and proving to be an excellent sea-boat."

Delaware was decommissioned on 10 February, and lay in ordinary at Norfolk until 1833. Recommissioned on 15 July 1833, she received President Andrew Jackson aboard on 29 July, firing a 24-gun salute at both his arrival and departure. The following day she set sail for the Mediterranean where she served as flagship for Commodore D. T. Patterson and cruised on goodwill visits and for the protection of the rights and property of American citizens until her return to Hampton Roads on 16 February 1836. She was placed in ordinary from 10 March 1836 until recommissioned on 7 May 1841 for local operations from Norfolk.

Delaware sailed on 1 November for a tour of duty on the Brazil Station as flagship for Commodore Charles Morris. She patrolled the coasts of Brazil, Uruguay, and Argentina to represent American interests during political unrest in those countries. On 19 February 1843, she sailed from Rio de Janeiro for another cruise in the Mediterranean. Delaware returned to Hampton Roads on 4 March 1844 and was decommissioned at Norfolk Navy Yard on the 22nd. Still in ordinary there in 1861, she was burned on 20 April along with other ships and the yard facilities to prevent their falling into Confederate hands.
