= The Circle (Portsmouth, Virginia) =

Historic commercial building in Virginia, United States

- Formerly listed on the U.S. National Register of Historic Places
- Virginia Landmarks Register
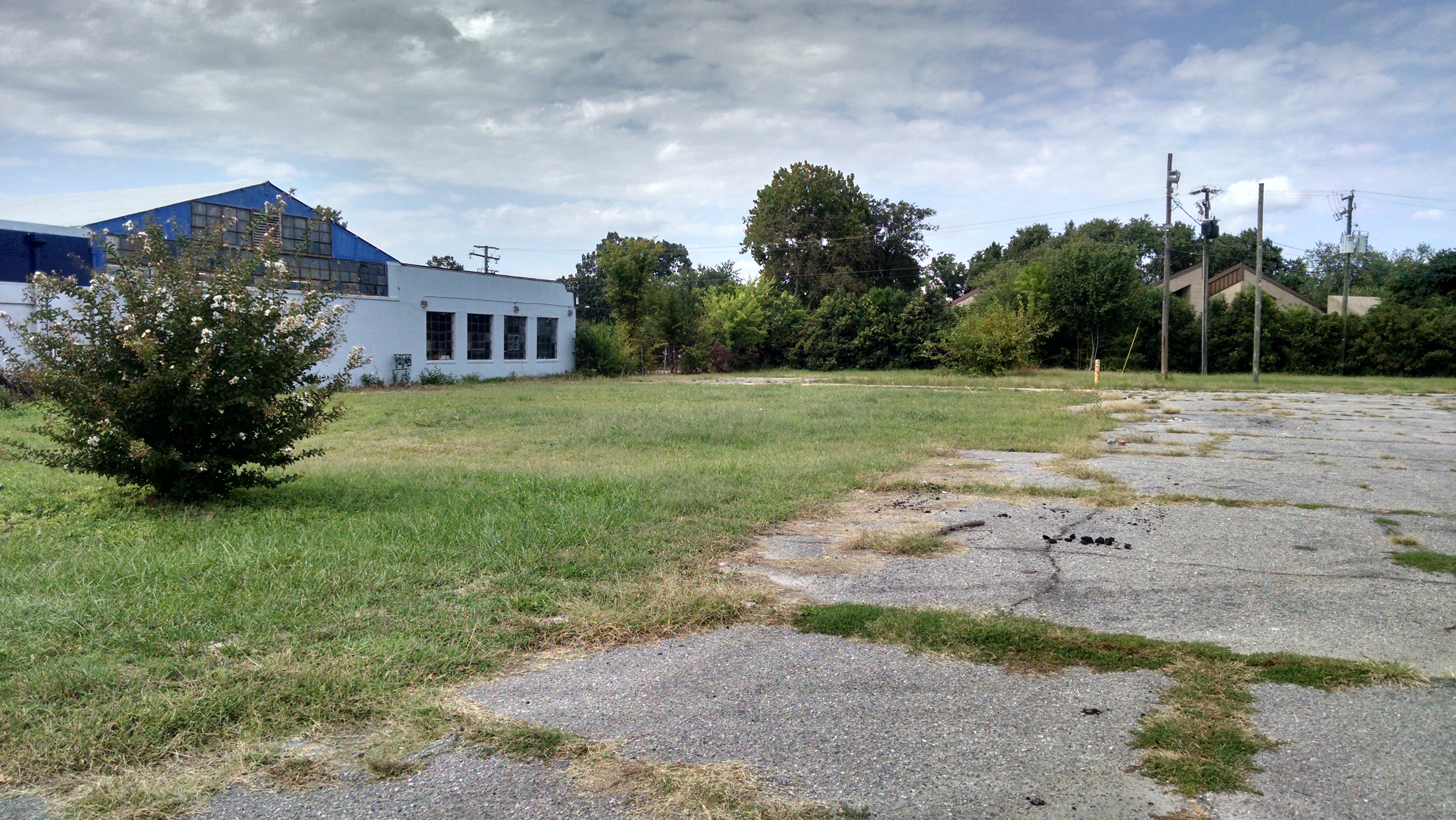
- The site of the restaurant

- Location within Virginia Location within the United States
- Location: 3010 High St., Portsmouth, Virginia
- Coordinates: 36°50′12″N 76°20′19″W
- Area: 1 acre (0.40 ha)
- Built: 1947
- Built by: Culpepper, R.A. and Son
- Architect: Morgan, Dorothy P.
- Architectural style: Moderne
- NRHP reference No.: 06000120
- VLR No.: 124-5089

Significant dates
- Added to NRHP: March 8, 2006
- Designated VLR: December 7, 2005
- Removed from NRHP: February 7, 2017
- Delisted VLR: September 15, 2016

The Circle was a historic building in Portsmouth, Virginia designed by Dorothy Pebworth and constructed in 1947 — as a single story, stuccoed concrete block building in the Moderne style — originally as a curb-service restaurant, subsequently becoming a dine-in restaurant.

The building's half-circle shape (in plan) featured a prominent facade topped with a neon-lit sign carrying the restaurant's name. Its interior bar featured a mural attributed to Al Hirschfeld of mid-20th century celebrities.

Listed on the National Register of Historic Places in 2006, the building was demolished on August 19, 2013 and removed from the National Register in 2017.
