= Portsmouth Olde Towne Historic District =

Historic district in Virginia, United States

- U.S. National Register of Historic Places
- U.S. Historic district
- Virginia Landmarks Register
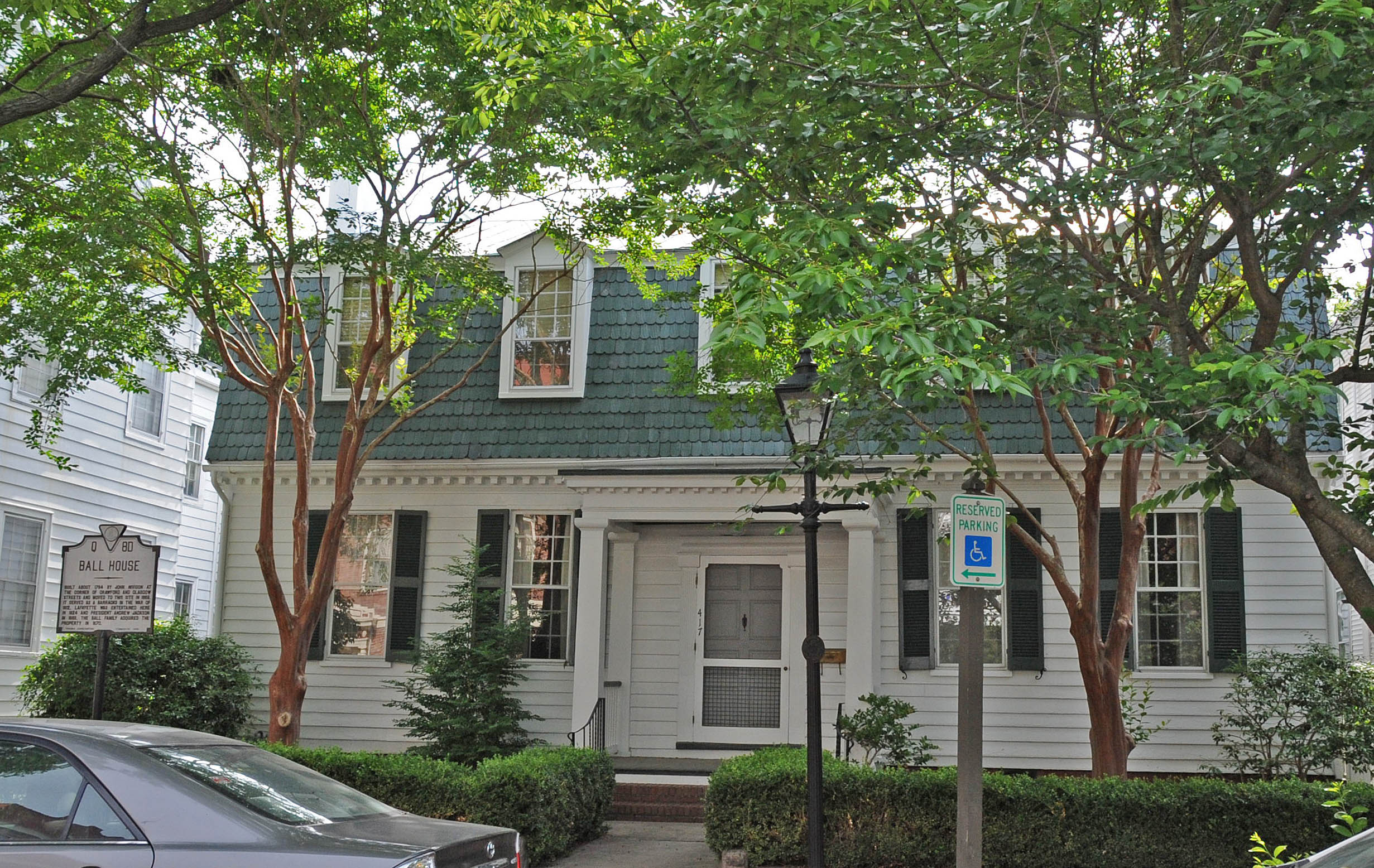
- Ball House

- Location within Virginia Location within the United States
- Location: Bounded by Crawford Pkwy., London St., the Elizabeth River, and extending 0.1 mi. W of Washington St., Green and Queen Sts., Portsmouth, Virginia
- Coordinates: 36°50′20″N 76°18′7″W
- Area: 138 acres (56 ha)
- Architectural style: Greek Revival, Queen Anne, Federal, Late 19th And 20th Century Revivals, Late Victorian, Romanesque Revival
- NRHP reference No.: 70000877, 83004251 (Boundary Increase)
- VLR No.: 124-0034

Significant dates
- Added to NRHP: September 8, 1970, October 6, 1983 (Boundary Increase)
- Designated VLR: April 7, 1970, January 18, 1983

Portsmouth Olde Towne Historic District, is a national historic district located at Portsmouth, Virginia. It encompasses 89 buildings. It is located in the primarily residential section of Portsmouth and includes a notable collection of Federal and Greek Revival style townhouses, known as "basement houses." Other notable buildings include the Watts House (1799), Grice-Neeley House (circa 1820), Ball-Nivison House (1752), Emanuel African Methodist Episcopal Church (1857), St. John's Episcopal Church (1898), Court Street Baptist Church (1901-1903), and Union Machinist Home. Located in the district is the separately listed Monumental Methodist Church.

It was listed on the National Register of Historic Places in 1970, with a boundary increase in 1983.
