= Commodore Theatre =

Historic theatre in Portsmouth, Virginia, US

- U.S. National Register of Historic Places
- U.S. Historic district – Contributing property
- Virginia Landmarks Register
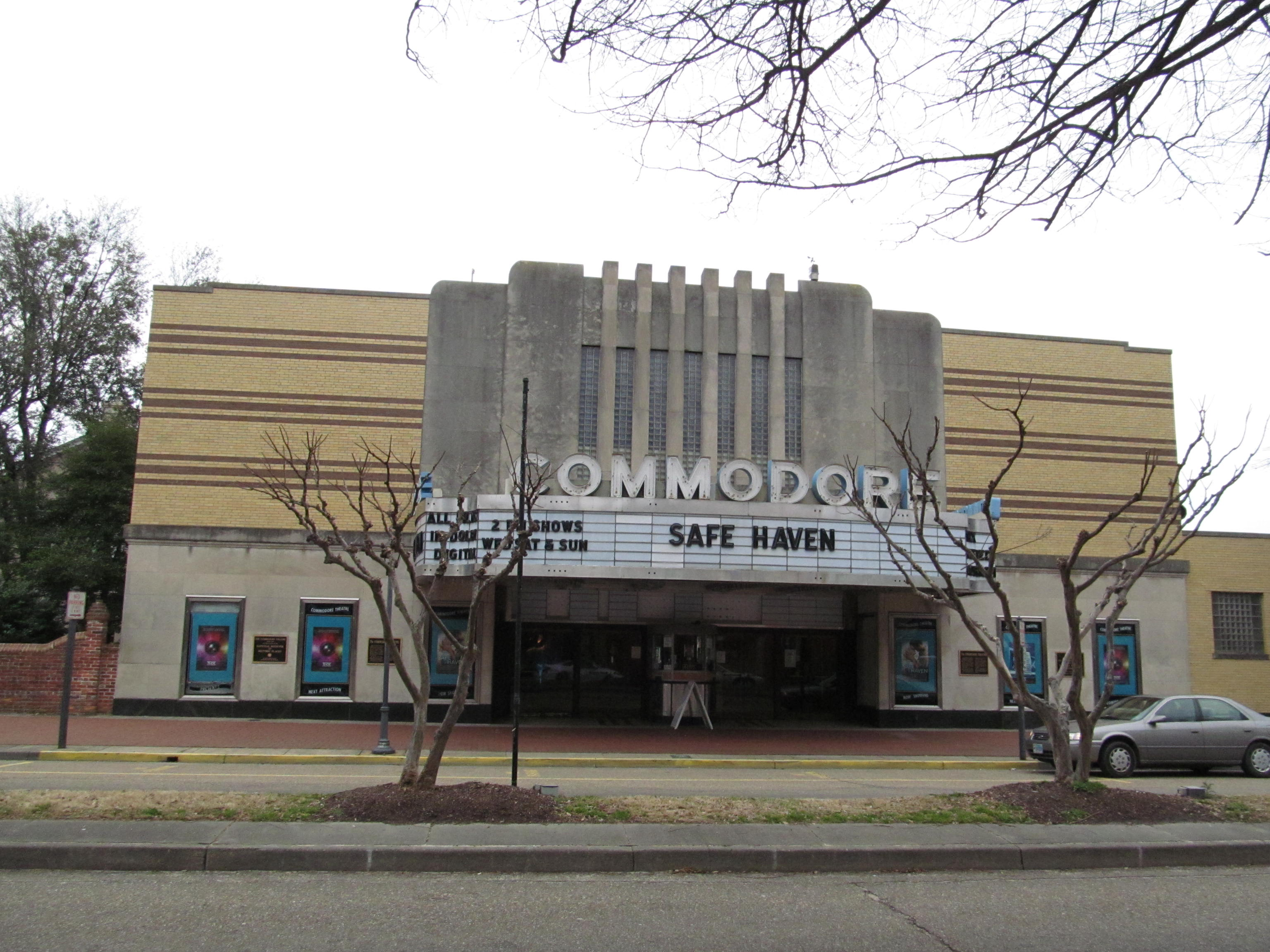
- Commodore Theatre

- Location within Virginia Location within the United States
- Location: 421 High St., Portsmouth, Virginia
- Coordinates: 36°50′5″N 76°18′8″W
- Area: less than one acre
- Built: 1945
- Architect: Zink, John J.
- Architectural style: Art Deco
- NRHP reference No.: 97000203
- VLR No.: 124-0101

Significant dates
- Added to NRHP: February 27, 1997
- Designated VLR: December 4, 1996

Commodore Theatre is an historic movie theater located at Portsmouth, Virginia. It was built in 1945 in the Streamline Art Deco style, and originally sat 1,000 people. The theater closed in 1975 and sat empty until a change in ownership and extensive renovation beginning in 1987. It reopened two years later, and as of 2023 was in operation displaying first-run films accompanied by a full kitchen.

== History ==
The Commodore was built in 1945 by William Stanley Wilder, a Portsmouth native who owned and operated several theaters in Virginia's Tidewater region from the 1920s through the 1940s. The theater was named after Commodore James Barron, an officer on the frigate USS Chesapeake involved in the Chesapeake–Leopard affair and who is buried in a churchyard next to the theater. It is rumored that the construction supplies for the building – which ordinarily would have been unavailable due to wartime shortages – were allocated to the project due to the entertainment it would provide to the large number of soldiers stationed in Portsmouth.

The theater's design has been described as "an excellent example of the Streamline Art Deco style." Its two-story façade features a plain mass of yellow pressed brick decorated with horizontal stripes of brown brick on the upper level with a central pavilion of curved-top vertical pylons of Indiana limestone and decorative strips of glass block. The lower level of the façade is composed of Indiana limestone ashlar veneer with a base of black marble. A dominant element of the auditorium is the pair of restored murals on the side walls representing the progress of America and the commerce and industry of Hampton Roads.

After a period of declining attendance and conversion to an adult theater, the Commodore closed in 1975. It sat empty until being purchased by the current owner who performed a two-year renovation. The exterior's marquee and ticket booth were retained, as were the majority of interior fixtures. The original seating was removed from the main auditorium floor and replaced with dinner theater-style seating; a balcony uses traditional auditorium-style seating.

The theater currently offers first-run films on a nightly basis, featuring Dolby Digital and THX sound, accompanied by a dining experience serviced by a full kitchen in the main building.

It was listed on the National Register of Historic Places in 1997. It is located in the Downtown Portsmouth Historic District.
