= National Black Police Association =

National Black Police Association may refer to either:

- National Black Police Association (United Kingdom)
- National Black Police Association (United States)

== See also ==
- The Black and Tans, constables recruited into the Royal Irish Constabulary during the Irish War of Independence
