= NBPA =

NBPA can refer to:

- National Basketball Players Association
- National Black Police Association (UK)
- National Black Police Association (United States)
