= Archie Elliott =

Archie Elliott may refer to:

- Archie Elliott, Lord Elliott (1922–2008), Scottish judge
- Archie Elliott Jr., retired African-American lawyer and judge in Portsmouth, Virginia
- Archie Elliott III (1968–1993), African-American man killed by police officers in 1993
