= Black police =

Black police or Black cop may refer to:

- Black Cop, a 2017 film
- Black Cop, a song from the KRS-One album Return of the Boom Bap
- Hong Kong Black Police, a derogatory term for law enforcement during the 2019–2020 Hong Kong protests
- Black people in law enforcement, including:
  - Black people in American law enforcement, a facet of the demographics of American law enforcement

== See also ==
- National Black Police Association (United Kingdom)
- National Black Police Association (United States)
