= National Emergency March for Justice Against Police Brutality =

1999 civil rights movement demonstration

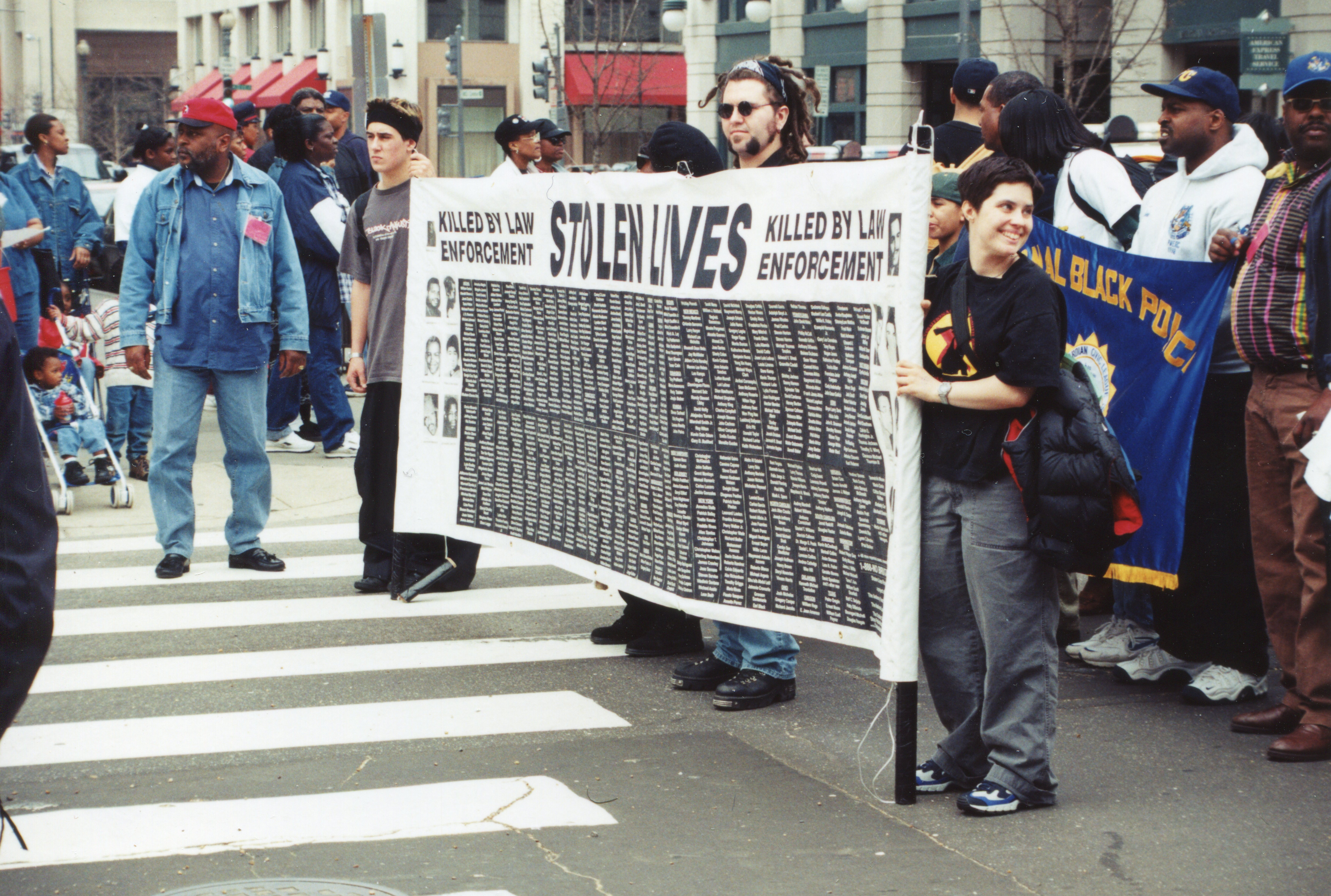
- An assembly near the Martin Luther King, Jr. Memorial Library
- Date: April 3, 1999; 27 years ago
- Location: Washington, D.C., U.S.
- Caused by: Police brutality in the United States; Killing of Amadou Diallo; Killing of Tyisha Miller; Killing of Donta Dawson; New York City Police Department corruption and misconduct; New York Mayor Rudy Giuliani's public support of police officers involved in shootings of unarmed individuals; President Clinton's failure to address allegations of police brutality
- Result: 2,500 people participate

The National Emergency March for Justice Against Police Brutality was a gathering held in Washington, D.C., on Easter Saturday, April 3, 1999, in response to police brutality. The catalyst for the event was the February 1999 shooting of an unarmed black immigrant, 23-year old Amadou Diallo, by police officers in New York City. The march was organized by the Center for Constitutional Rights.

== Background and planning ==
On February 4, 1999, Amadou Diallo was killed by four New York City police officers after they fired 41 bullets at him, hitting him 19 times. Diallo was an unarmed black immigrant from Guinea. The officers were members of the NYPD Street Crime Unit. Following Diallo's death, Reverend Al Sharpton organized protests in New York City which garnered national attention and criticized corruption and misconduct in the New York City Police Department. One protest took place on March 3, 1999, with Sharpton leading thousands of demonstrators to Wall Street. As part of the protest, nineteen individuals staged a sit-in at Merrill Lynch, due to the company's financial backing of New York Mayor Rudy Giuliani. Additionally, eleven community leaders, including Sharpton, Wyatt Walker, Charles Barron, and Ron Daniels, sat in the middle of Broadway, stopping traffic. The protesters sitting at Merrill Lynch and on Broadway were arrested. Protesters then marched from Wall Street to the National Action Network headquarters in Harlem.

President Bill Clinton did not immediately address Diallo's death or ongoing police brutality. Congressman Walter Fauntroy organized a demonstration of more than 1,000 people in front of the White House. Following this rally, leaders of civil rights organizations across the United States held an emergency press conference in Washington, D.C., with hopes of starting a national movement demanding police reform. Ron Daniels called for a national emergency march. Following the press conference President Clinton briefly addressed the issue of police violence, but activists claimed his remarks did not go far enough. Activists were also frustrated by the response of Giuliani's public support of officers involved in police brutality cases across New York City. While Diallo's death was the catalyst for the organization of the march, the deaths of Tyisha Miller in California and Donta Dawson in Pennsylvania in the fourth months leading up to Diallo's death, as well as increased attention to police brutality across the country also contributed. The protests for Diallo also drew attention back to the 1993 killing of Archie Elliott III.

The march was planned by the Center for Constitutional Rights and relatives of victims of police brutality. The Center for Constitutional Rights also filed a federal lawsuit that sought to stop operations of the NYPD Street Crime Unit. The date chosen for the march was Easter Saturday, April 3, 1999, the 31st anniversary of the assassination of Martin Luther King Jr. Organizers asked members to assemble at 10 a.m. on the National Mall at G Street Northwest near the Martin Luther King Jr. Memorial Library between 9th and 10th streets. Starting at noon, they planned to march down 10th street, past the Department of Justice, ending with a rally on the West Lawn of the United States Capitol. NAACP President Kweisi Mfume and National Youth and College Director Jamal Harrison Bryant also called for a Day of Nonviolence on April 4, 1999, focusing on black-on-black crime. In the week leading up to the march, the four officers who killed Diallo were indicted on charges of second-degree murder. The United States Commission on Civil Rights also planned to hold a public hearing on May 26, 1999, in New York to address police brutality.

Members of the NAACP in Frederick County, Maryland, organized a bus to transport people from Frederick to Washington on the morning of the protest. The cost of riding the bus was $10.

== March ==
The march began at 10 a.m. at the Martin Luther King Jr. Memorial Library in downtown Washington, D.C. Approximately 2,500 people showed up for the march. Outside the library, protesters chanted "no justice, no peace, no more racist police," and "let's stop the Klan in blue." The Executive Director of the Center for Constitutional Rights, Ronald Daniels, addressed the crowd as they gathered, stating that "The senseless police murder of Amadou Diallo was the proverbial straw that broke the camel's back," and it was "the tip of the iceberg in terms of the scourge of police brutality misconduct afflicting communities of color and poor communities across this nation." Protesters wore t-shirts and buttons bearing Amadou's name and photograph. As they marched toward the United States Capitol, demonstrators continued chanting "no justice, no peace." The protesters' demands included federal responses to police brutality, including a Presidential commission, Congressional hearings, and financing for a provision of the 1994 crime bill that would mandate the Federal reports on police abuse cases. The protesters carried placards with the names and photographs of victims of police violence, including Rodney King in Los Angeles, Abner Louima in Brooklyn, Jonny Gammage in Pittsburgh, and Archie Elliott III in Maryland.

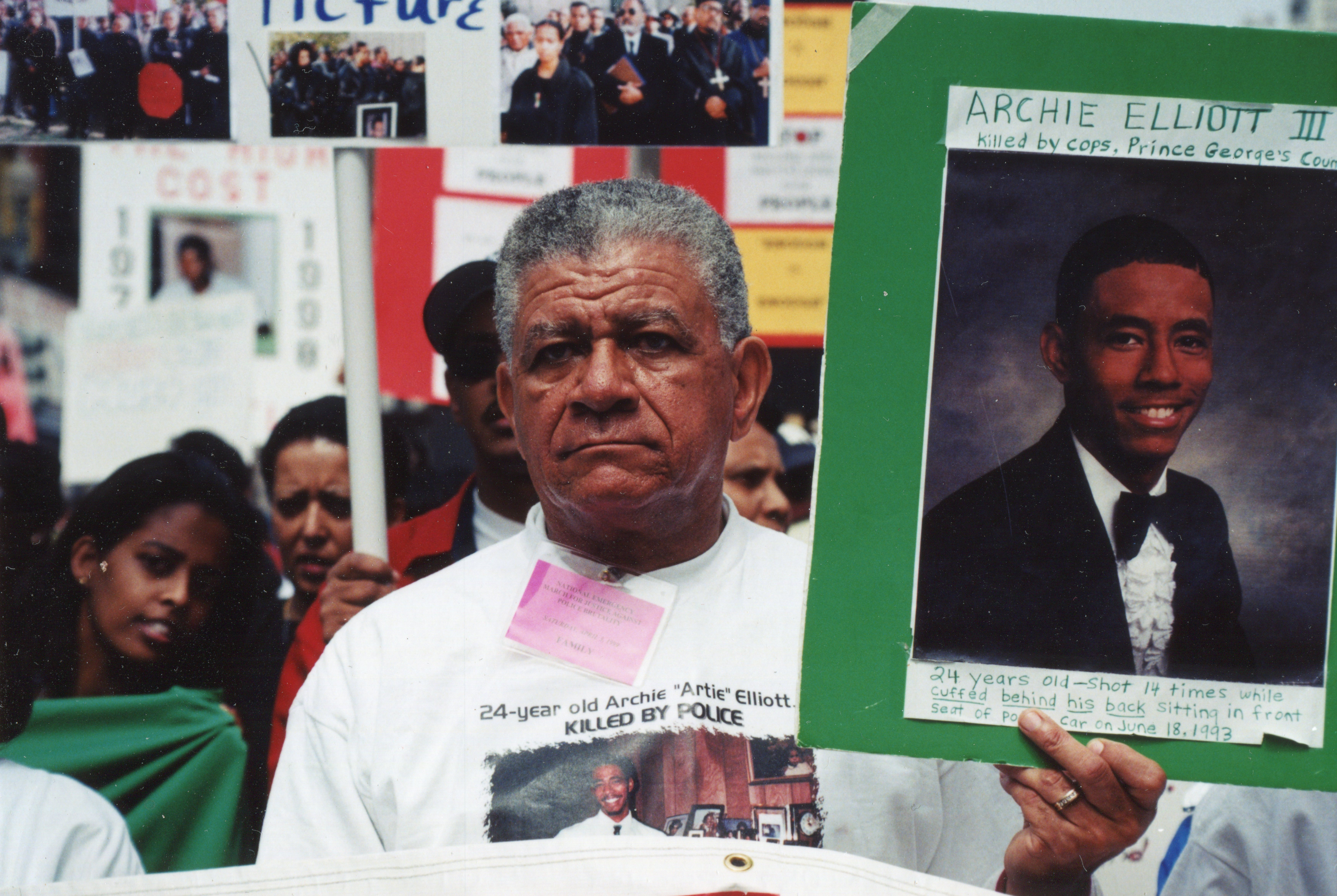
Judge Archie Elliott Jr. holds a placard bearing the name and photo of his son, Archie Elliott III

After the protesters arrived at the Capitol, several speakers addressed the crowd, including Reverend Al Sharpton. Sharpton arrived in the late afternoon along with members of Diallo's family. Sharpton began his remarks by leading a chant of "no justice, no peace." He then called out to President Bill Clinton and New York mayor Rudy Giuliani, asking them to address police brutality.

Attendees also included Martin Luther King III, radio host Joe Madison, politician Wilhelmina Rolark, and Virginia judge Archie Elliott Jr.

== Response ==
Although Reverend Al Sharpton had addressed Rudy Giuliani in his remarks, Giuliani spoke to reporters late that day telling them that he did not believe New York City was a focus of the rally and stating "the New York City Police Department has one of the best records in the country."

In 2004, the NYPD Street Crime Unit was disbanded.

In 2006, Sharpton led another March for Justice Against Police Brutality in New York City after the killing of Sean Bell.

== Gallery ==
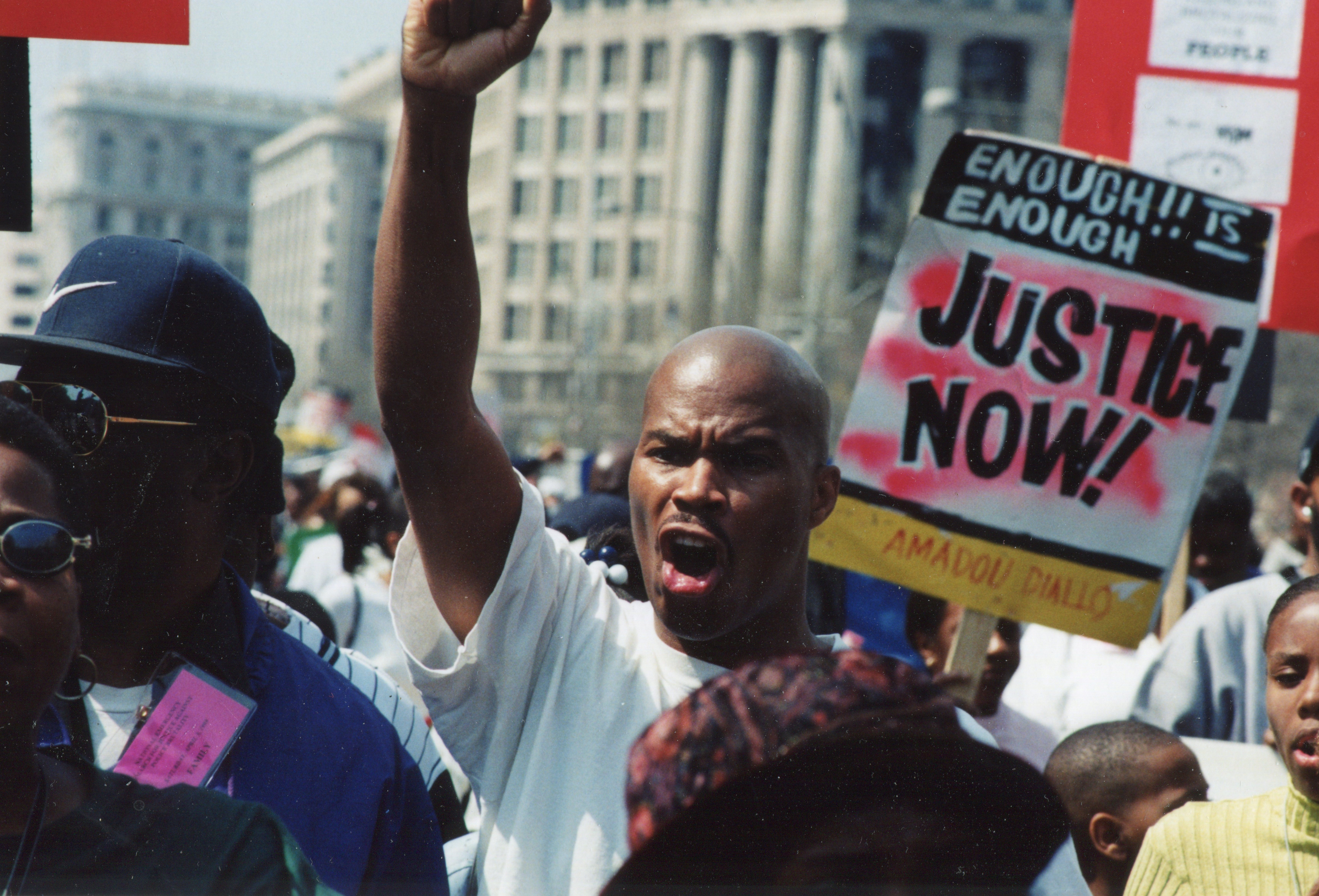
Protester Jonnie Jackson lifts a fist in the air

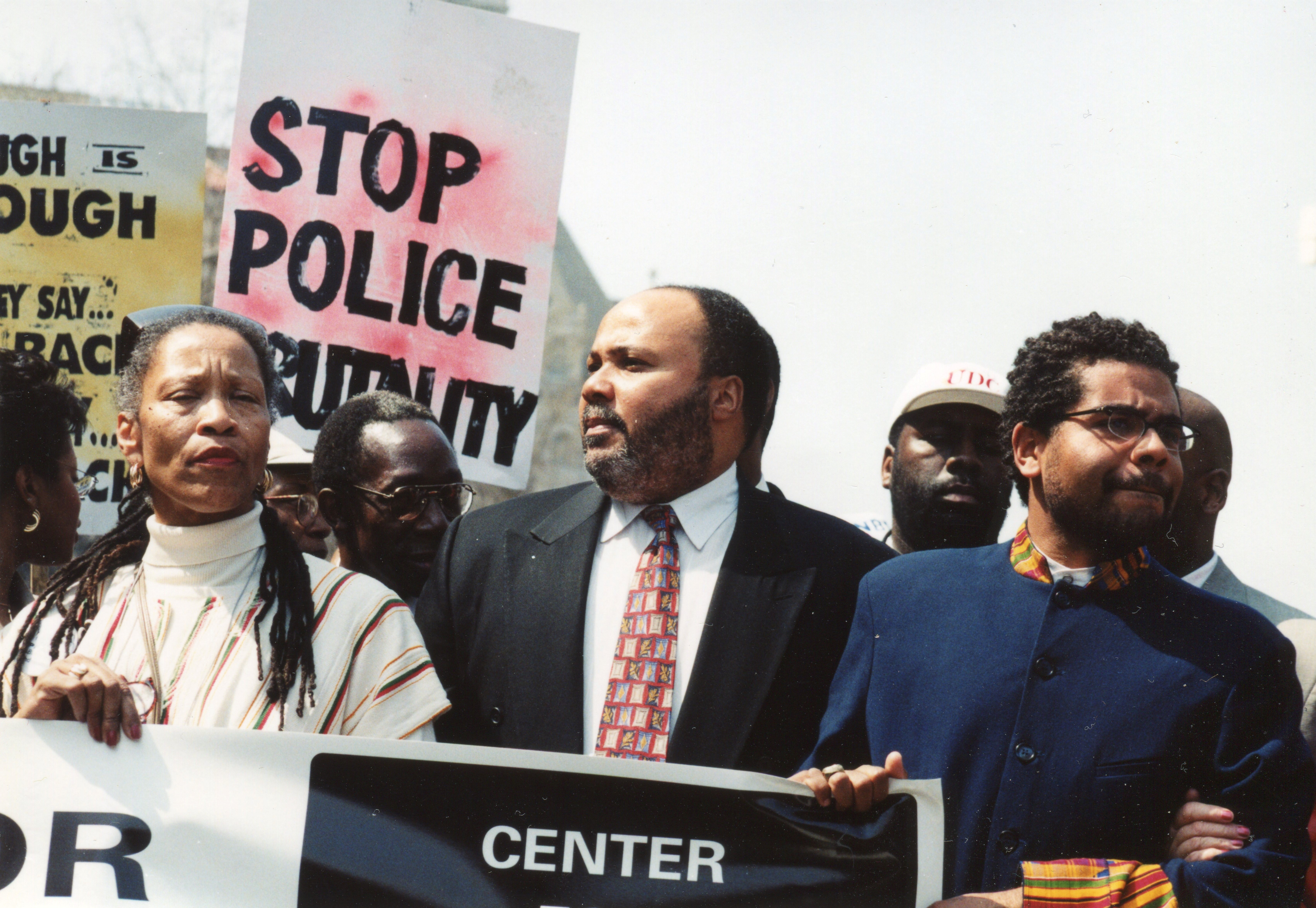
In the middle, Martin Luther King III

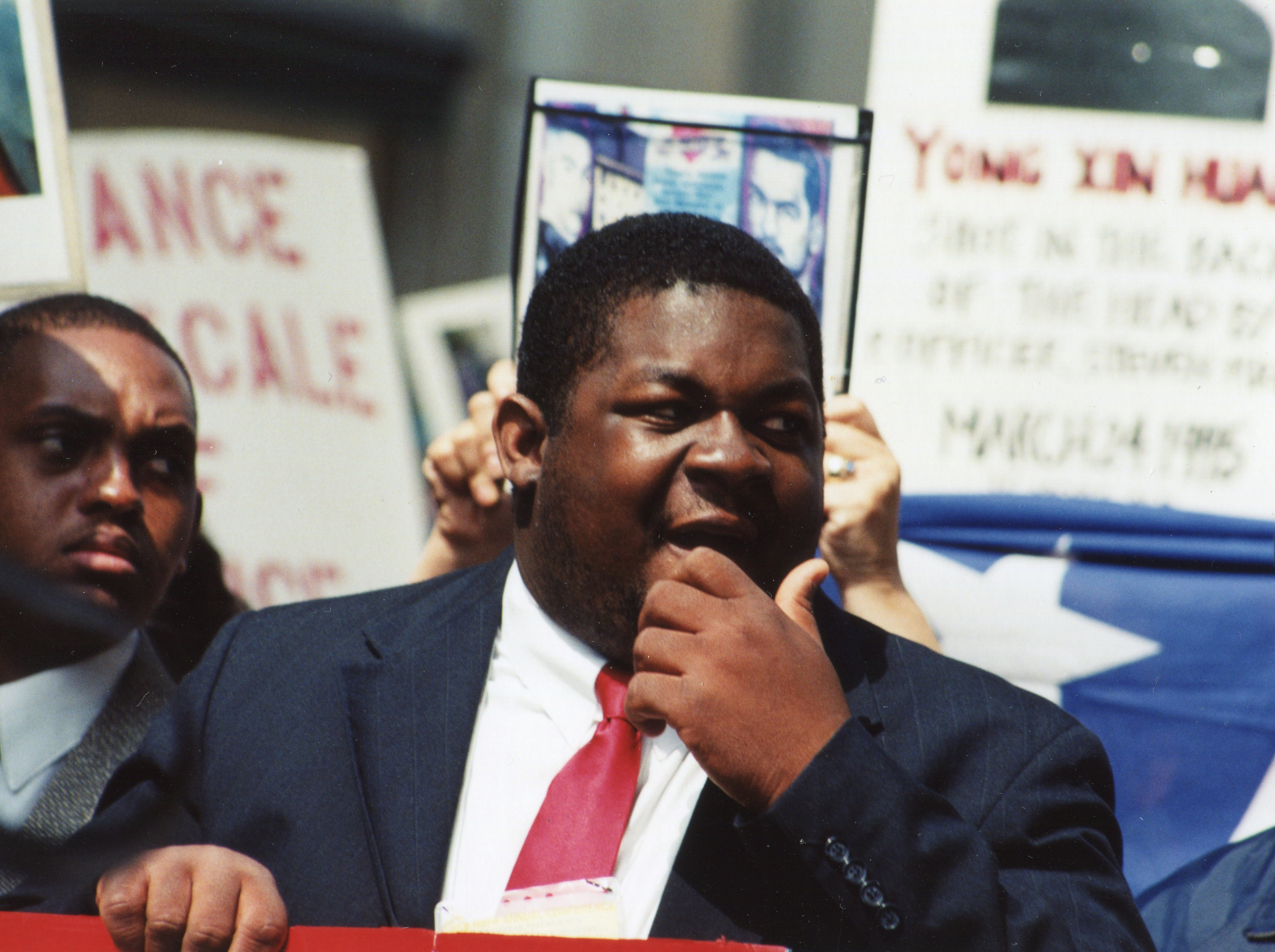
Reverend Markel Hutchins

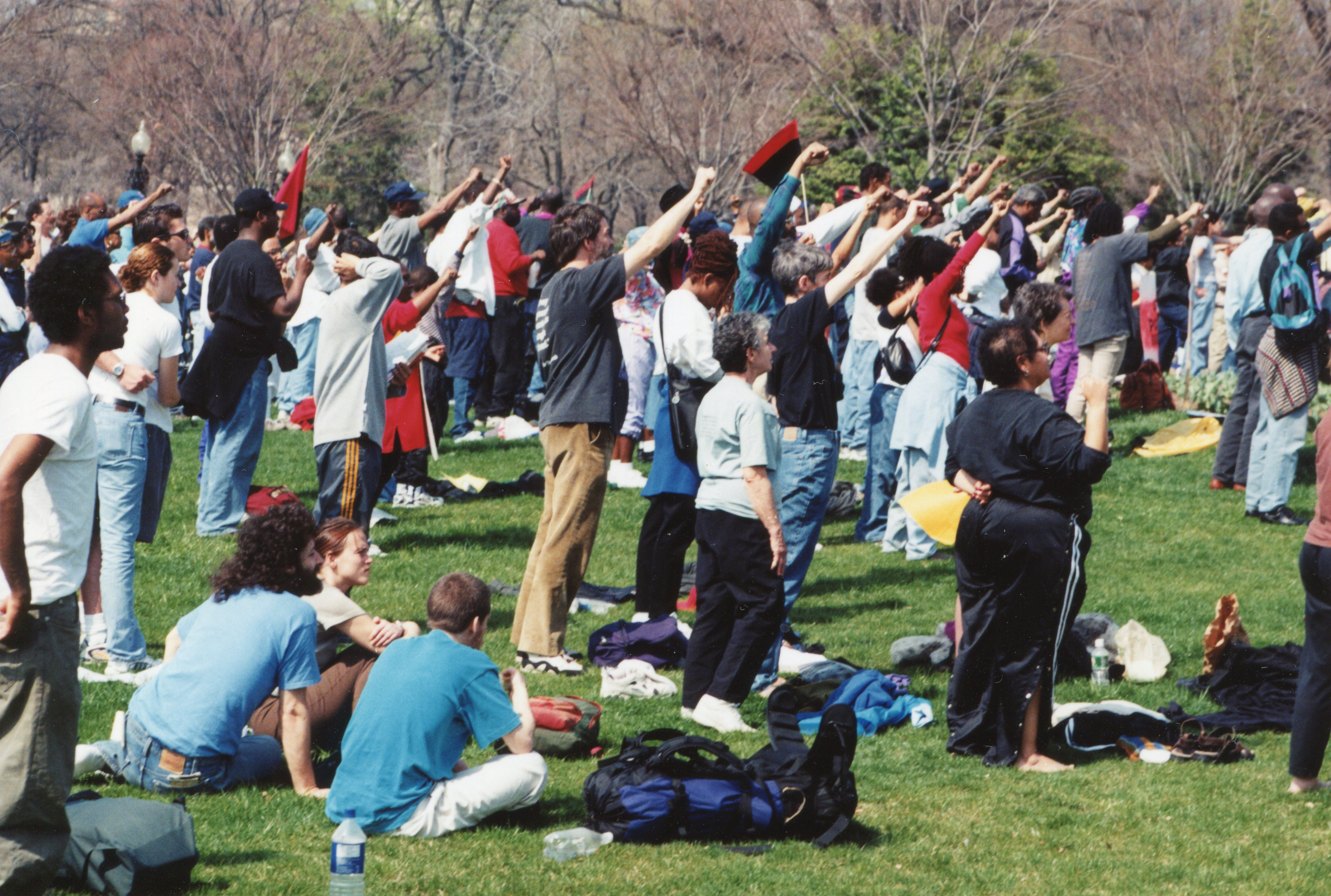
Rally on the West Lawn of the United States Capitol

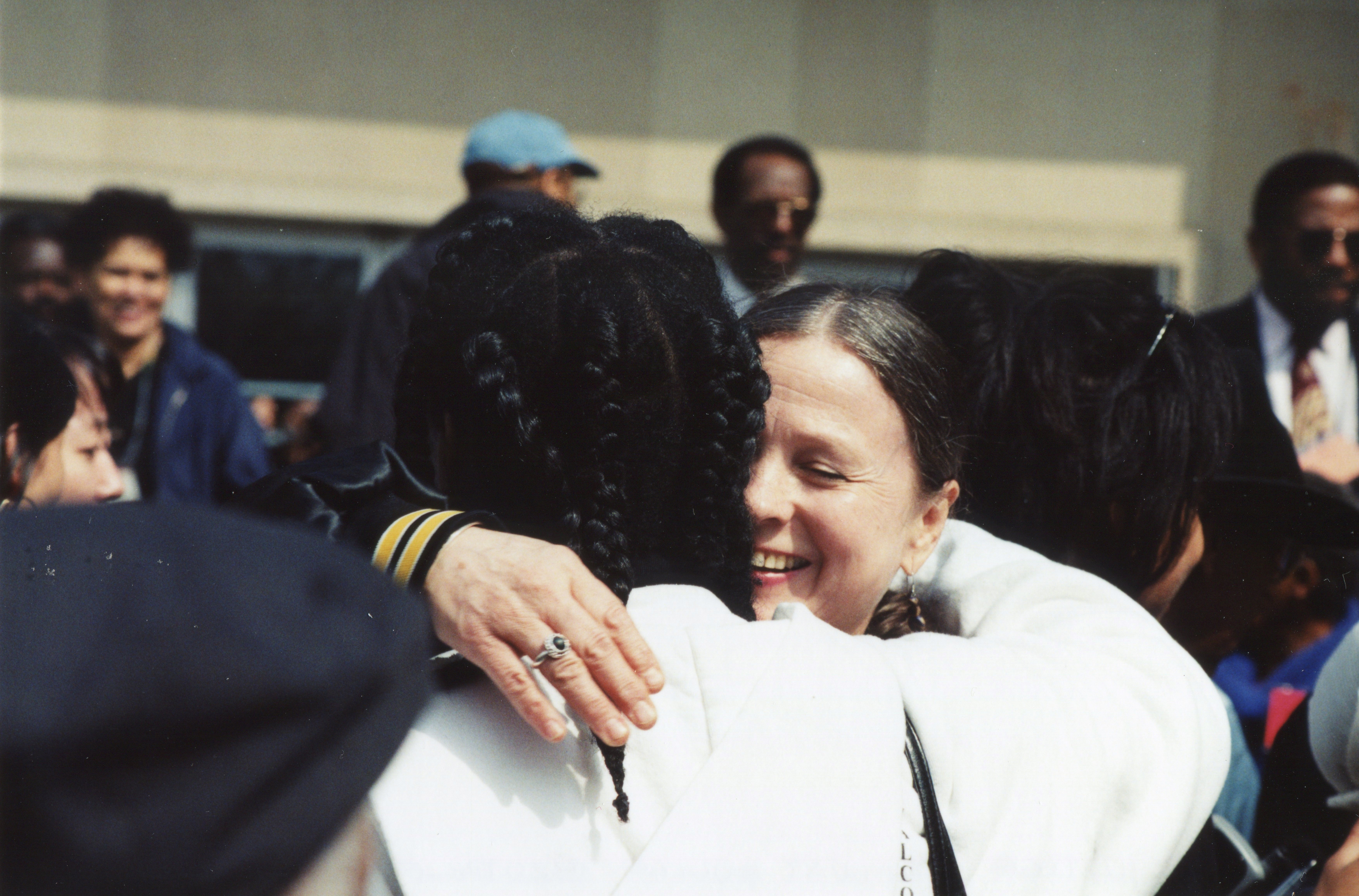
Two protesters embrace

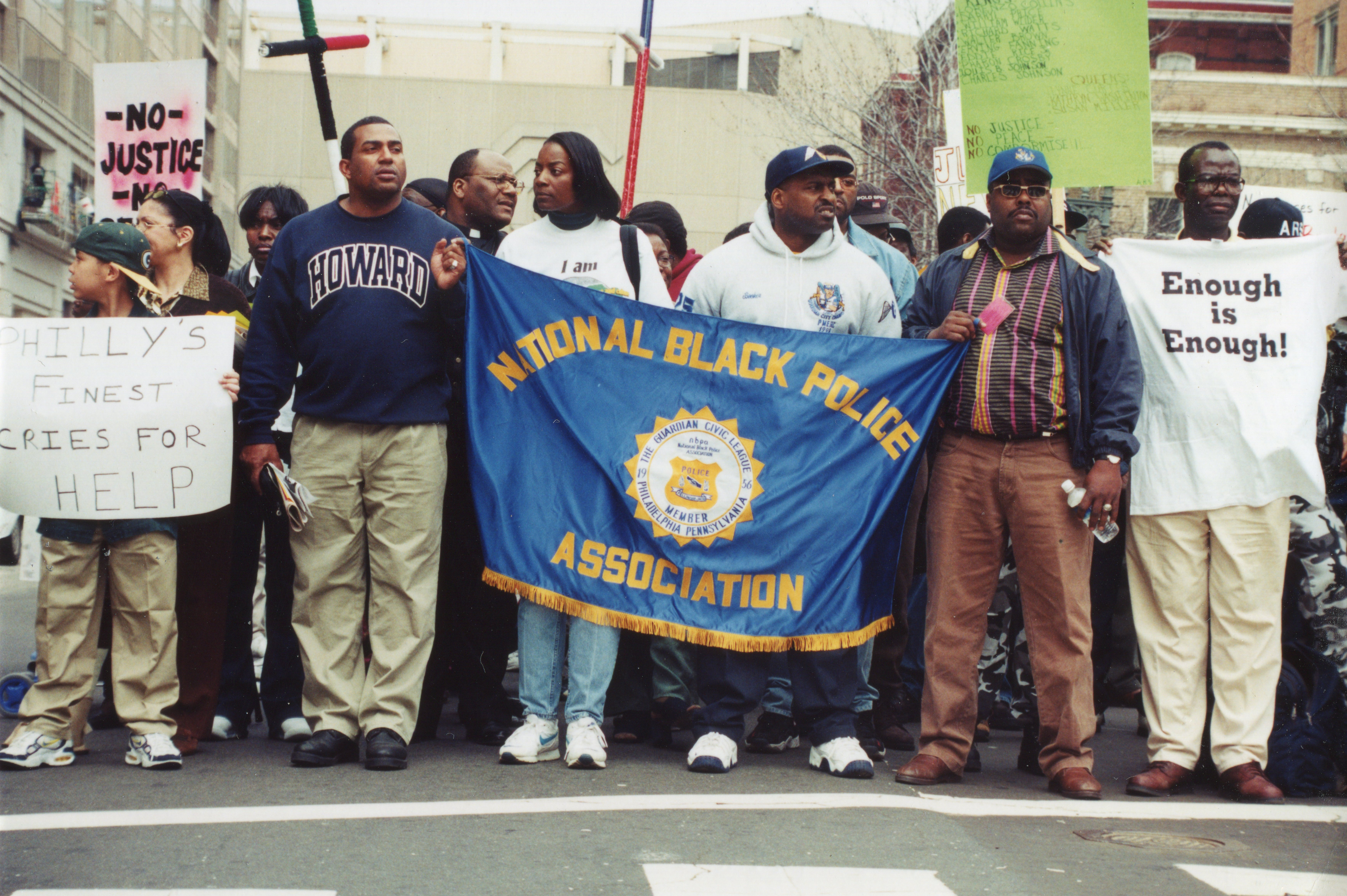
Members of the National Black Police Association

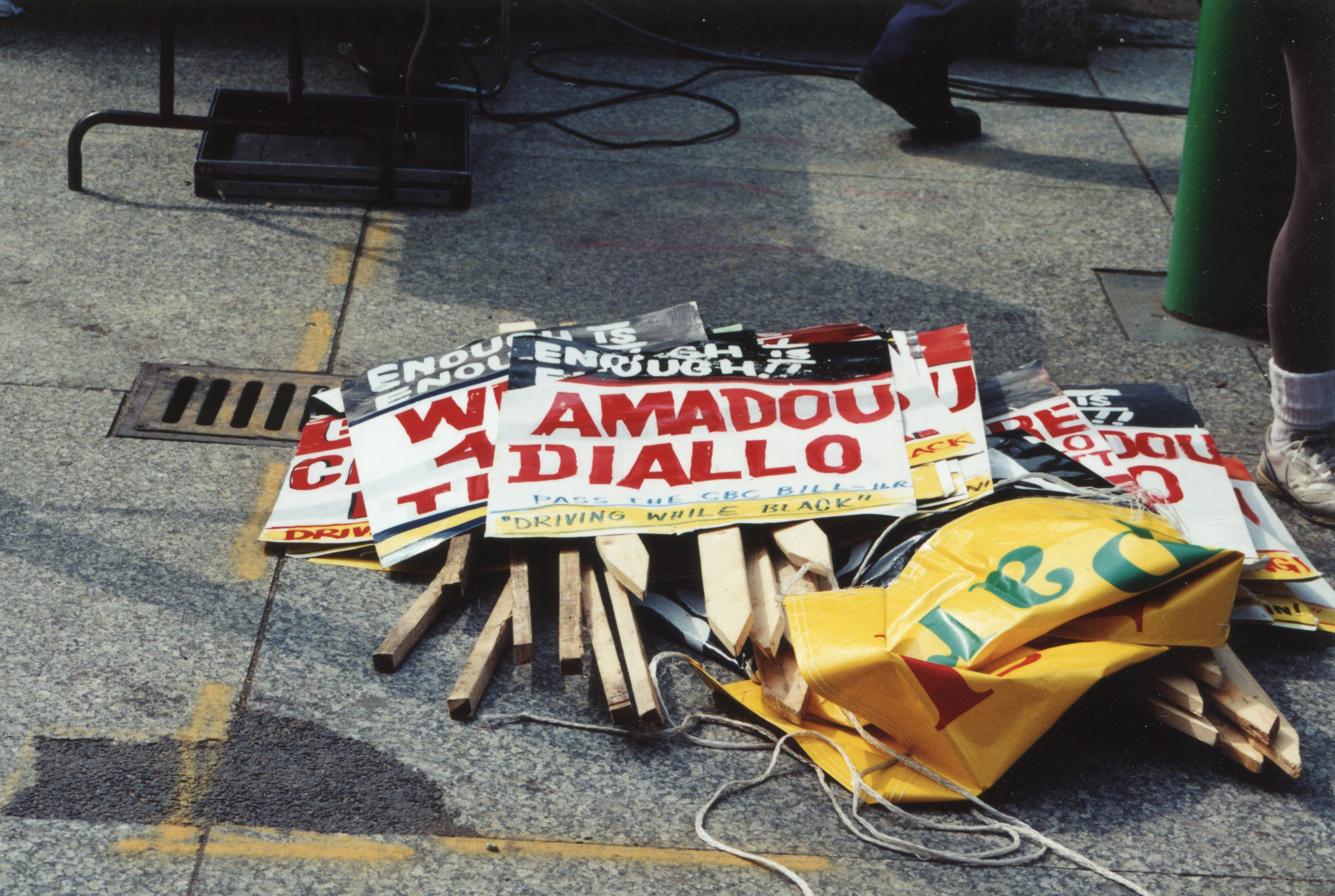
Signs carried by protesters

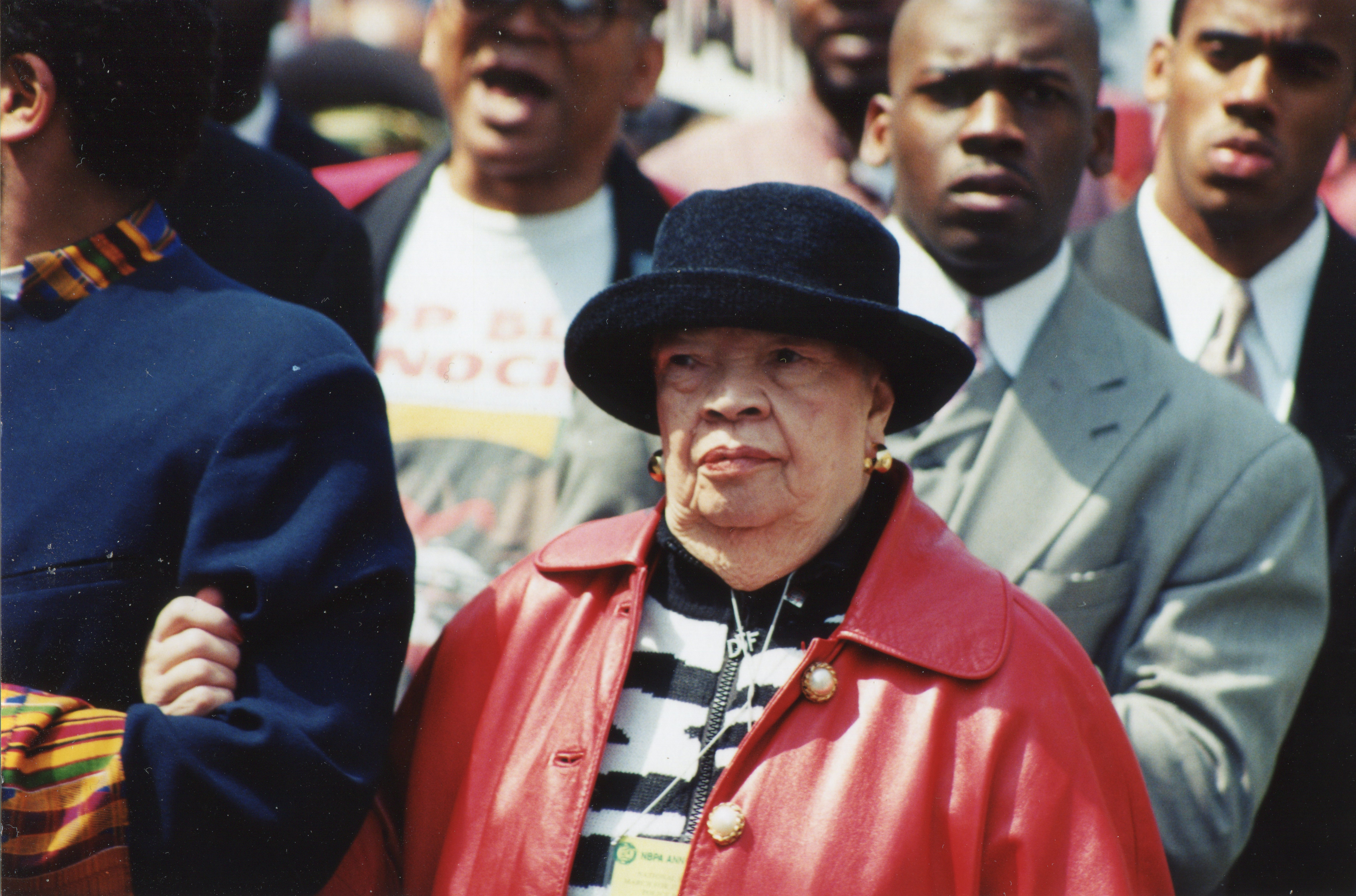
Wilhelmina Rolark

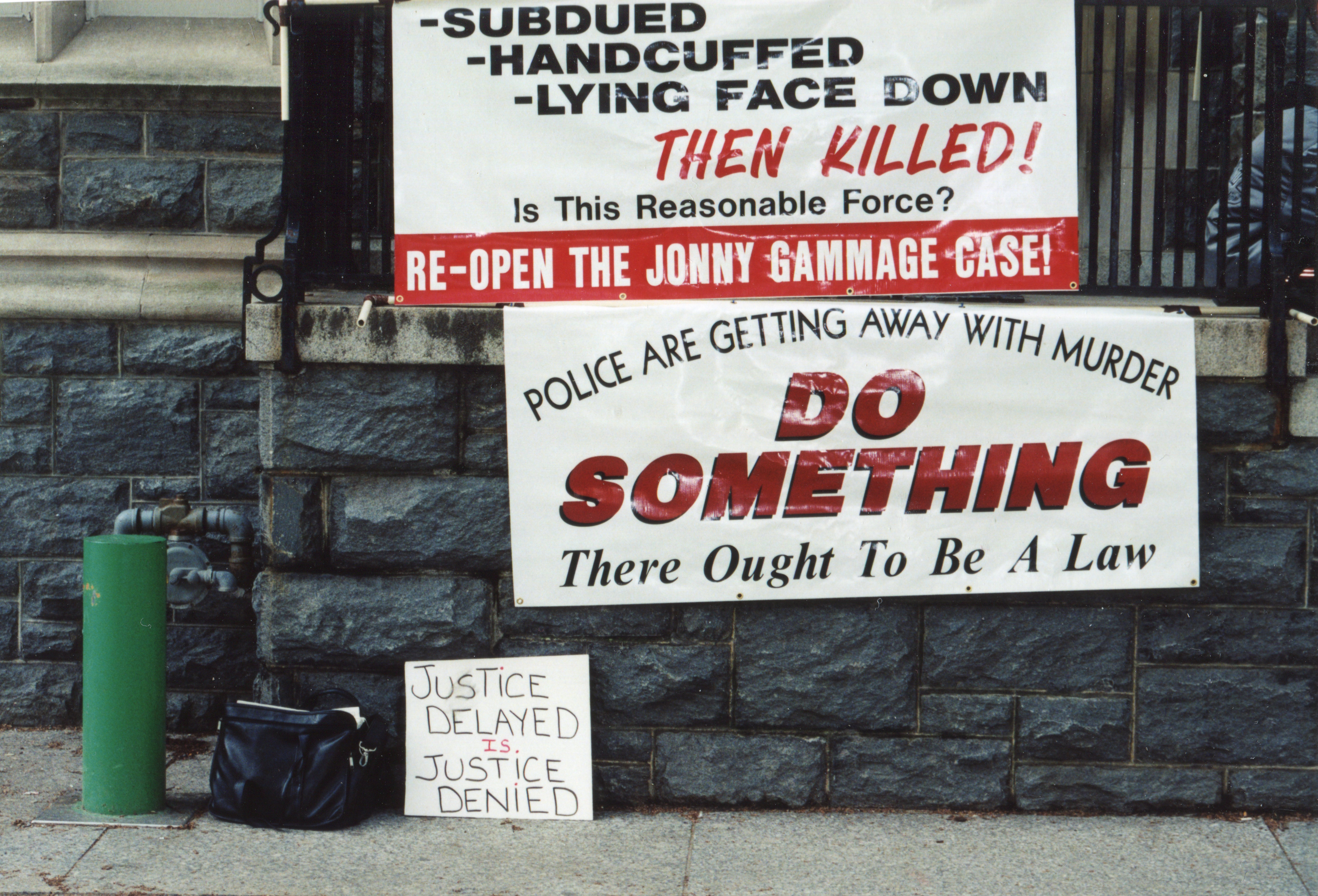
Banner calling for the Jonny Gammage case to be reopened

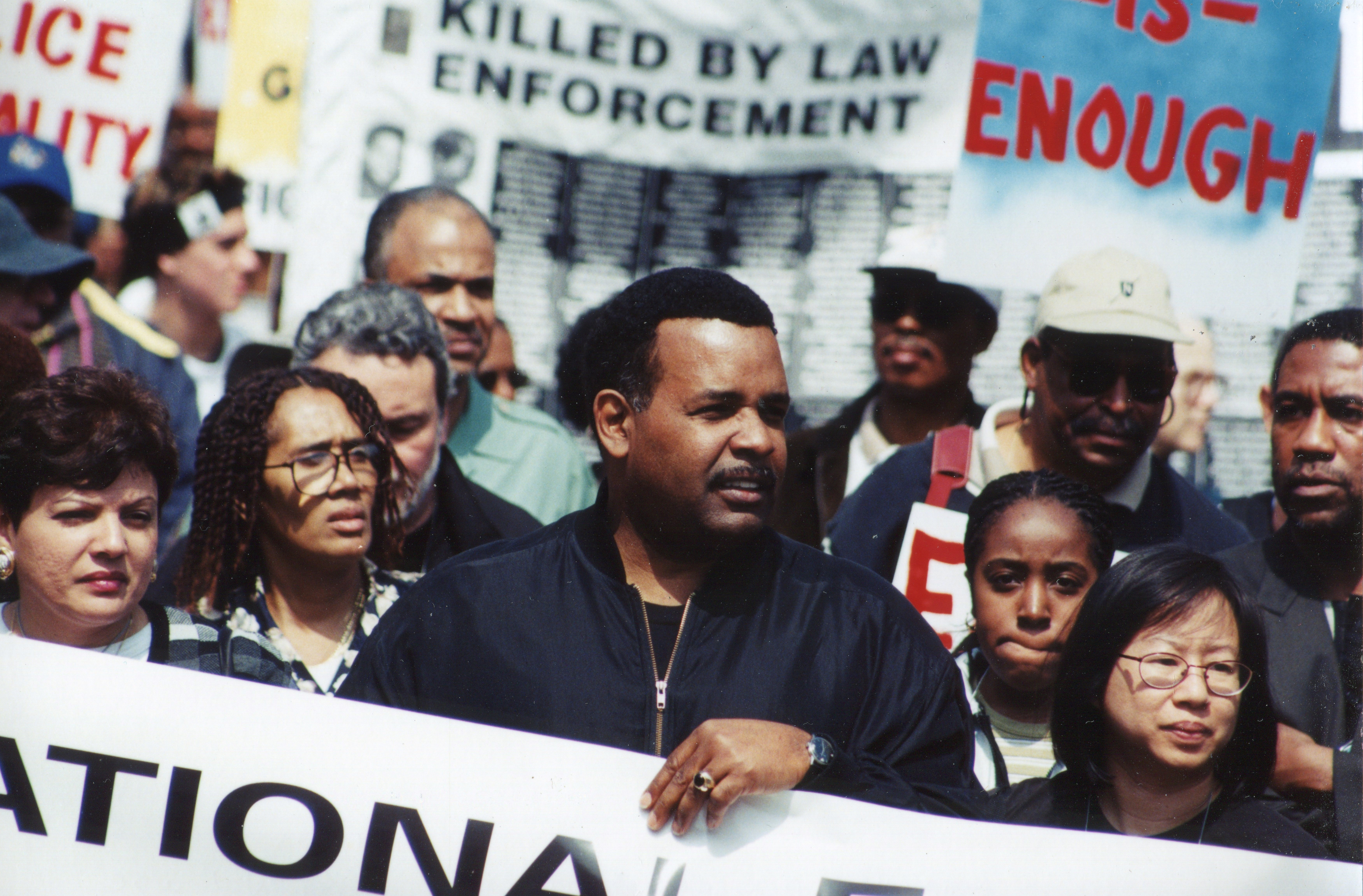
Joe Madison leads a group of protesters

== See also ==
- Killing of Amadou Diallo
- List of protest marches on Washington, D.C.
- List of unarmed African Americans killed by law enforcement officers in the United States
- List of killings by law enforcement officers in the United States
- Civil rights
- New York City Police Department corruption and misconduct
- Police brutality in the United States
