= City of London Academy Highbury Grove =

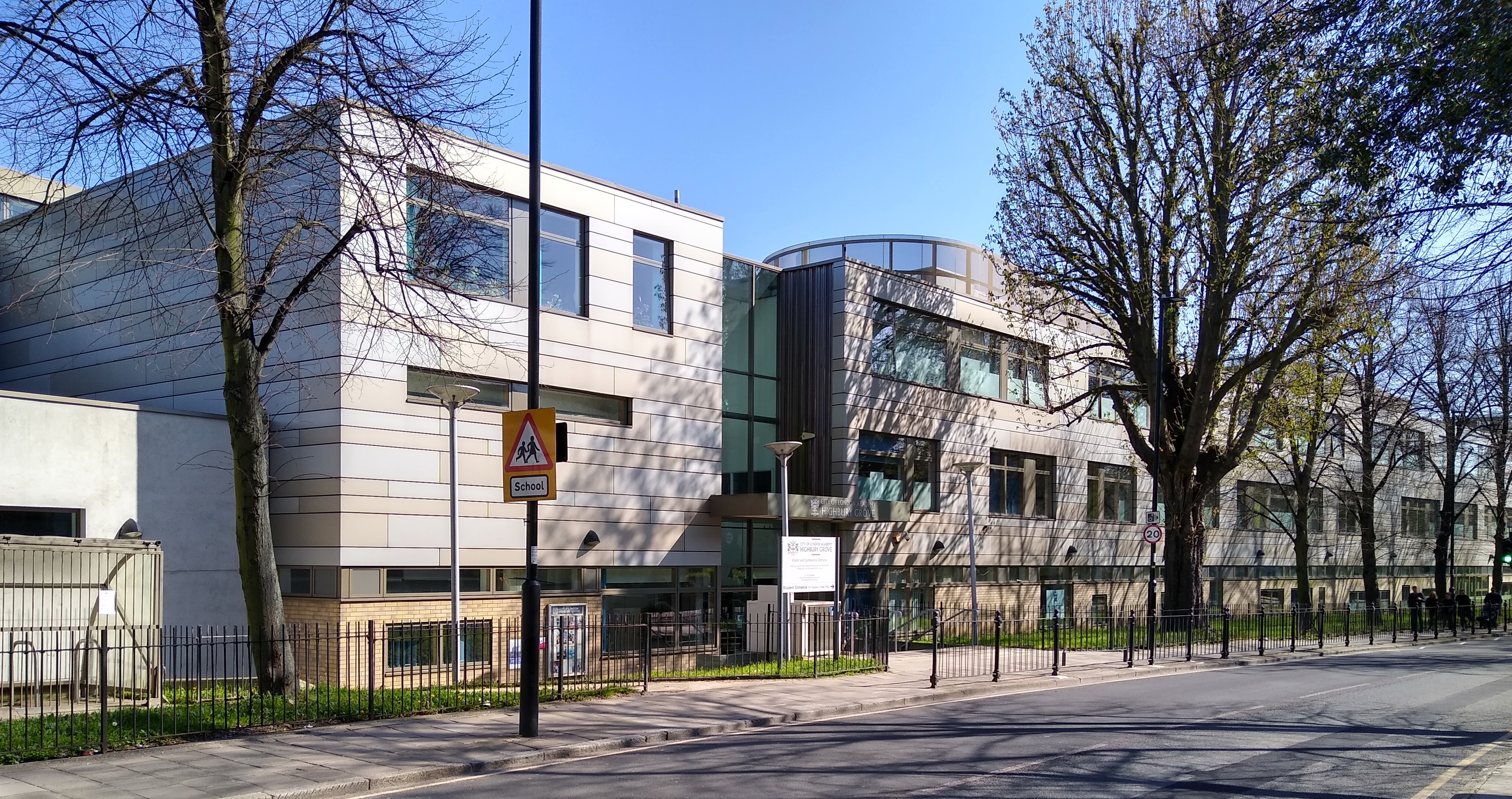

Location
- 8 Highbury Grove; London, N5 2EQ; England; 51.5495°N 0.0974°W

Information
- Former name: Highbury Grove School
- Type: Academy
- Established: 1967
- Local authority: Islington London Borough Council
- Trust: City of London Academies Trust
- Department for Education URN: 144962 Tables
- Ofsted: Reports
- Principal: Aimee Lyall
- Gender: Mixed
- Age range: 11–18
- Enrolment: 1,121
- Capacity: 1,149
- Houses: Aqua; Ignis; Terra; Ventus
- Website: www.highburygrove.cola.org.uk

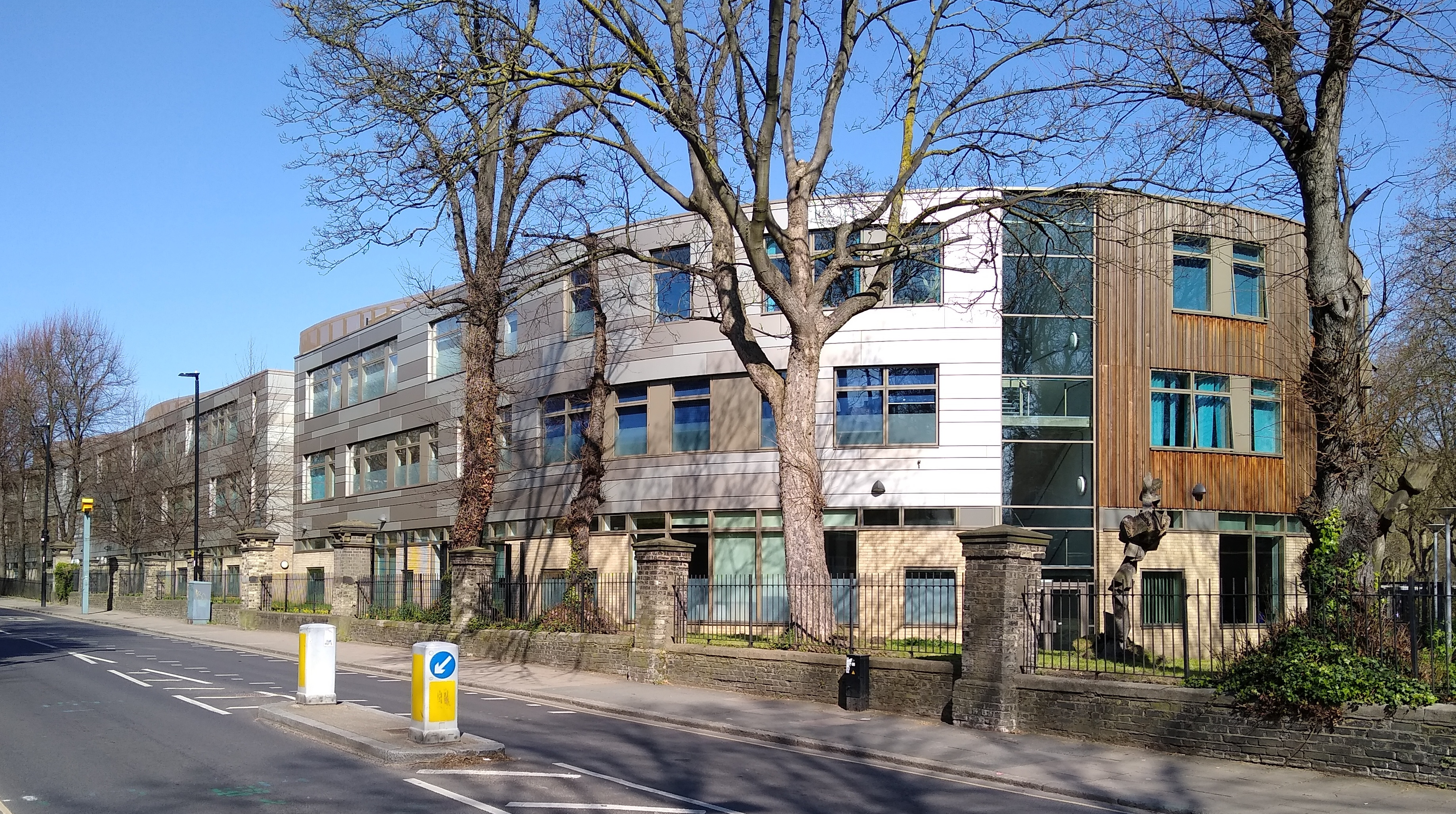

City of London Academy Highbury Grove (formerly Highbury Grove School) is an 11–18 mixed secondary school with academy status, located in the London Borough of Islington, England. It is part of the City of London Academies Trust.

== History ==
Highbury Grove School began life as an all-boys comprehensive in 1967. The founding headmaster was Dr Rhodes Boyson. It was created out of three former boys' schools in the area, Highbury Grammar School, Barnsbury Boys' School, and Laycock School, as part of a comprehensivisation scheme by the then Inner London Education Authority. Boyson introduced a regime of strict discipline, including caning for misbehaviour. Excellent academic results were achieved, and the school was soon heavily oversubscribed.

Boyson left in 1974, after being elected a Conservative MP; in the 1980s he was to become an education minister under Prime Minister Margaret Thatcher.

The school moved into a new building on the same site in December 2009.

In its December 2016 report, Ofsted described the school as "inadequate", with particular concerns about discipline, pupil progress, and finances. In January 2017, the head teacher Tom Sherrington abruptly left the school, which was put into special measures. This led to the school being taken over in September by the City of London Academy Trust. In September, Ofsted inspectors revisited the school and found a "well-ordered environment in which pupils behave well".

== Students ==
The school has approximately 1,600 pupils. A sizeable proportion of pupils have English as their second language. More than half the pupils are from Black Caribbean, Black African and Bangladeshi groups and about one third of pupils are from Turkish and other minority ethnic groups. Well over half of the pupils have been assessed with learning difficulties, disabilities, or literacy, dyslexia or language needs. There is also an adjoining school called "Samuel Rhodes" that helps people who have special needs and disabilities)

== Notable alumni ==
- Adebayo Akinfenwa, footballer for Wycombe Wanderers
- Peter Ebdon, snooker player and former world champion
- Leroy Logan, author known for contributions to policing in the United Kingdom. Founding member and later chair for 30 years of the National Black Police Association
- Geoff Palmer (scientist), Jamaican British scientist known for his discovery of the barley abrasion method and for being the first black professor in Scotland
- Joe Swash, actor and television presenter
- Frank Warren, boxing promoter
- Jake Wood, actor, played Max Branning in EastEnders
- Chris Whyte – footballer
