= Red, White and Blue (2020 film) =

2020 film of Small Axe anthology film series

- Poster for Amazon Prime Video release
- Directed by: Steve McQueen
- Written by: Steve McQueen; Courttia Newland
- Distributed by: BBC One; Amazon Prime Video
- Release dates: 24 September 2020 (New York Film Festival); 29 November 2020 (United Kingdom)
- Running time: 80 minutes
- Country: United Kingdom
- Language: English

Red, White and Blue is a 2020 historical drama film directed by Steve McQueen and co-written by McQueen and Courttia Newland. It stars John Boyega as Leroy Logan, an officer in the London Metropolitan Police who founded the Black Police Association and attempted to reform the police force from within. The film was released as part of the anthology series Small Axe on BBC One on 29 November 2020, and released on Amazon Prime Video on 4 December 2020. It premiered as an opening film at the 58th New York Film Festival on 24 September 2020.

== Cast ==
- John Boyega as Leroy Logan
  - Nathan Vidal as Young Logan
- Steve Toussaint as Ken Logan
- Joy Richardson as Mrs. Logan
- Corey Peterson as Philford
- Neil Maskell as Inspector Willis
- Stephen Boxer as Chief Inspector
- Calum Callaghan as PC Beck
- Conor Lowson as TPC David
- Assad Zaman as PC Asif Kamali
- Antonia Thomas as Gretl
- Liam Garrigan as Greg Huggan
- Tyrone Huntley as Leee John
  - Jaden Oshenye as Young Leee
- Nadine Marshall as Jesse John
- Mark Stanley as Ed Harrigan
- Seroca Davis as Hyacinth

== Release ==
The film premiered at the 2020 New York Film Festival, which was held virtually, shown alongside two other films from Steve McQueen's Small Axe series, Mangrove and Lovers Rock.

== Critical reception ==
Review aggregator Metacritic assigned the film a weighted average score of 84 out of 100, based on 18 critics, indicating "universal acclaim". On Rotten Tomatoes, the film holds an approval rating of 97% based on 88 reviews, with an average rating of 8.3/10. The site's critics consensus reads, "An urgent and timely biopic that's as sumptuous as it is searing, Red, White, and Blue is a triumph that gives the undeniably talented John Boyega the starring role he deserves."

Critics praised the film for evoking a sense of urgency and anger. K. Austin Collins of Rolling Stone wrote that "The tense urgency we feel throughout this movie owes in great part to its structure, which, particularly in some of the argumentative family scenes, has a way of dredging up a thousand things at once, because any one rift risks giving everyone the excuse to lay bare all the despair and disagreement that'd been suppressed to that point." Odie Henderson, reviewing the film for RogerEbert.com, wrote that it "is not a coddling film. It's an angry one, a tricky meditation that forces you to put yourself in the shoes of someone you might actually consider a traitor or a fool. Boyega, who is fantastic, wears the burden of Leroy's loneliness very well, and you feel his desire for an ally, a friend or, most notably, a running buddy who looks like him."

John Boyega's lead performance received acclaim. Peter Bradshaw of The Guardian wrote that Boyega "takes his career to the next level with a heroic and even tragic portrayal of Logan," and compared the performance to Al Pacino's in Serpico. Kevin Maher of The Times called it Boyega's "most commanding" performance, commending his "simmering restraint, with wide-eyed naivety and with brief moments of fulminating rage."

Writing for The Ringer, Justin Charity observed that the film "hinges on the classic contest within minority groups: assimilation versus subversion," and compared its complex portrayal of bigoted police officers favorably to the anthology series Lovecraft Country. Sonia Saraiya of Vanity Fair described the film as "a frustratingly inconclusive story" which does not depict the later successes of Logan's career, noting that McQueen and Newland "don't allow Logan's story to ripen long enough to see the fruits of his persistence." Nevertheless, she opined that the father-and-son dynamic at the heart of the film was "beautifully and subtly told."

The film appeared on several critics' top ten lists of best films from 2020.
