= Metropolitan Black Police Association =

Union-like group for BAME police officers in London, England

The Metropolitan Black Police Association is a staff association in the United Kingdom which represents officers and staff in the Metropolitan Police who are black or Asian. The Met BPA was not subsumed into the National Black Police Association and has continued to exist as an independent staff association though it supports the NBPA.

== Purpose ==
The strap line for the Met BPA is "Working to make changes for the better". Its declared aims are to "Improve the working environment of black police staff and officers within the Metropolitan Police Service".

The Met BPA have laid out a number of actions they will attempt to fulfill to achieve their aim, they include establishing a support network for staff and officers. Establishing a social network organizing events for members. Working with the Metropolitan Police Service to improve recruitment of black, Asian and minority ethnic staff and officers to the MPS. Participating in policy development with the MPS, Mayor's Office for Policing and Crime (MOPAC) and the Home Office.

== History ==
The Black Police Association was first launched in 1994 at New Scotland Yard by Metropolitan Police Commissioner Sir Paul Condon (QPM DL FRSA.) This was following seminars which had been held in Bristol to discuss issues effecting black and ethnic minority police and staff. The BPA define black as “People of African, African-Caribbean or Asian origin”.

== Executive committee ==
The Met BPA is directed by a democratically elected Committee consisting of a Chair, Deputy Chair, General Secretary, Treasurer, executive members and co-opted members with a written constitution.

In 2013, the first female chair of the BPA was elected, Mrs Janet Hills. Her declared aims were “Add value to what my predecessors have done.” She specified fighting to ensure MPS policy was fair, supporting members, continuing community commitment and supporting youth leaders and role models. DS Hills has made a number of media appearances from interviews in the Jamaican Gleaner and The Voice to an appearance on Newsnight and has progressed the communication strategy of the Met BPA. She has also attended Police Federation Conference in Bournemouth and regularly attends strategic meetings in the MPS and nationally assisting in the shaping of national policy.

DS Hills has also written a number of articles such as “Does Diversity Make Good Business Sense?” in which she argues the need for diversity in an increasingly constricted policing budget. She also explains how the current MPS policy of making London’s police service look more like its population makes business sense.

In 2015 DS Hills attended the Black Police Association Conference in Atlanta Georgia entitled “Bridging the gap: Police and Community for Peace” where she addressed delegates.

== Membership ==
Full membership of the MetBPA is restricted to serving or former Officers and staff of African, African-Caribbean, or Asian origin.
