= Janet Hills =

English police detective

Janet Hills MBE
- Occupation: Police Detective
- Known for: Policing and community relations

Janet Hills MBE became president of the National Black Police Association (NBPA) in 2015-17. She was the first woman to be chair of the association in 2013. Her career in the London Metropolitan police force began at Brixton Police Station in 1991 and includes time in the Criminal Investigation Department (CID), the Community Safety Unit and the Human Trafficking Unit. She grew up in Croydon, and her parents are Jamaican. She was awarded an MBE in the New Year's Honours list 2021 for services to Policing and to Community Relations.

She has spoken about the disproportionate use and the impact that Taser use has on communities, institutional racism, and racial profiling. In 2020 commenting on the Met's race action plan Hiolls said “It is encouraging to see that the Met have agreed to make significant changes as a result, particularly around the recruitment of black police officers and those that define themselves as black, to ensure greater representation of police officers and staff at all ranks." Hills has also spoken out about the London Metropolitan Police failure to understand the experiences of women inside and outside the force.
