= John Boyega =

English actor (born 1992)

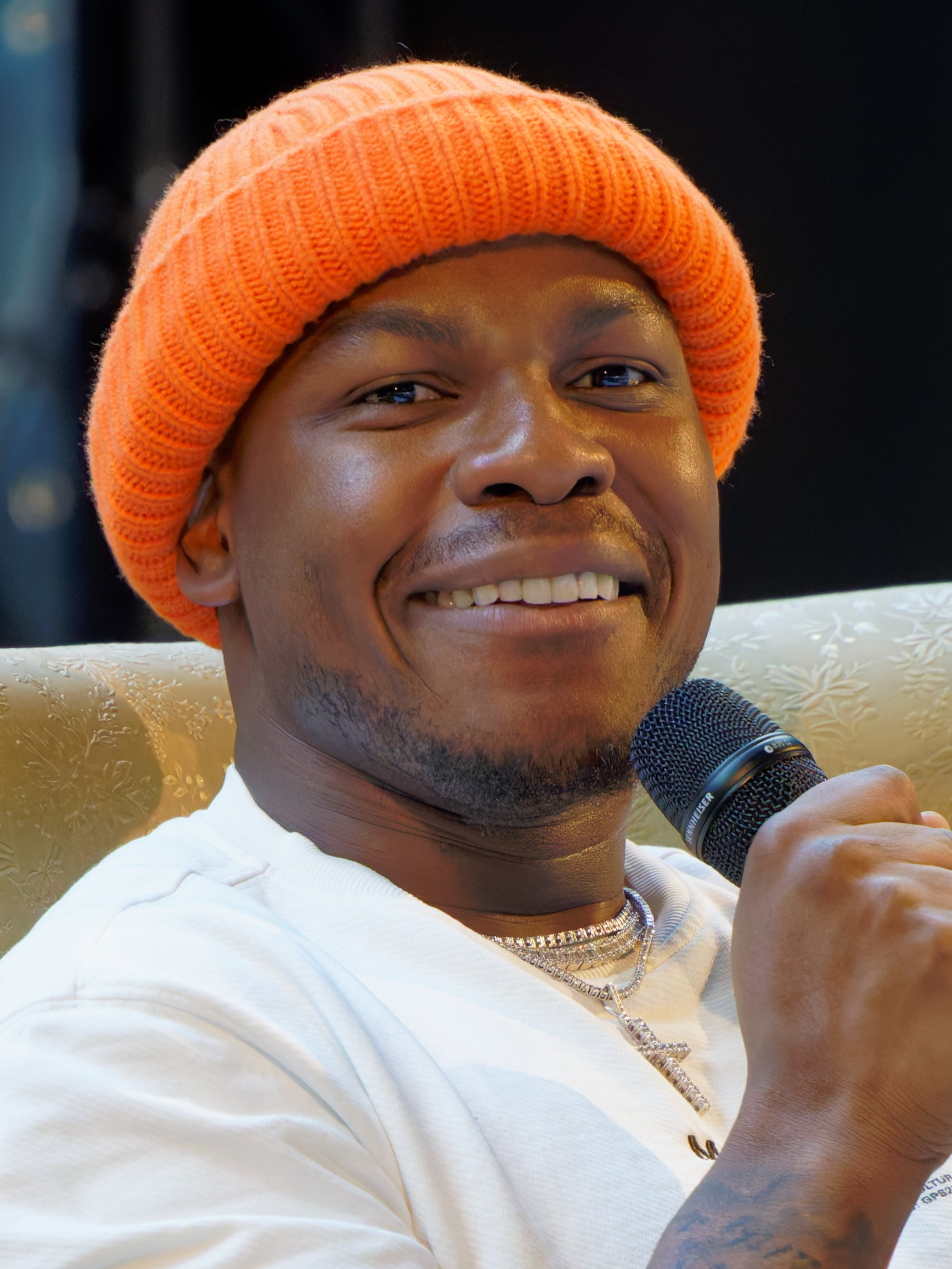
- Boyega in 2025
- Born: John Adedayo Bamidele Adegboyega; 17 March 1992 (age 34); Camberwell, London, England
- Occupations: Actor; producer
- Years active: 2010–present

John Adedayo Bamidele Adegboyega (born 17 March 1992), known professionally as John Boyega, is an English actor and producer. He first gained recognition in Britain for his role as a teenage gang leader in the comedy horror film Attack the Block (2011) before he had his international breakthrough playing Finn in Star Wars: The Force Awakens (2015). During his time as a cast member of the Star Wars sequel trilogy (2017 and 2019), Boyega received the BAFTA Rising Star Award in 2016, and the Trophée Chopard at the 2016 Cannes Film Festival.

Boyega's career continued to gain momentum in 2020 when he won a Golden Globe Award for his portrayal of Leroy Logan in Red, White and Blue, a part of Steve McQueen's anthology series Small Axe. He then played King Ghezo in the historical action film The Woman King (2022) and a drug dealer in the mystery film They Cloned Tyrone (2023). Since January 2016, he formed and owned an independent production company called UpperRoom Productions, which its first project he produced is the 2018 film Pacific Rim Uprising (2018), a sequel of Pacific Rim (2013).

== Early life ==
Boyega was born on March 17, 1992, in the Camberwell district of London and grew up in Peckham. His parents, Abigail (a carer) and Samson Adegboyega (a Pentecostal minister), are both of Yoruba descent. He has two older sisters.

His first acting role was playing a leopard in a play at Oliver Goldsmith Primary School. While acting in another play at the school when he was nine years old, he was noticed by Teresa Early, the artistic director of Theatre Peckham, a learning theatre for young people who live in south London. He spent his time there outside school hours from ages nine to fourteen. There was a rumour that his father wanted Boyega to become a minister, but John denied this in an interview with Sam Sanders on Fresh Air. He said that his father supported his theatrical interests. John and his sister Grace were some of the last people to see Damilola Taylor alive: they were friends of his and the Boyegas helped look after him.

In 2003, Boyega began his secondary education at Westminster City School, where he was in various school productions. From 2008 to 2010, he attended South Thames College at the college's Wandsworth campus to study for a National Diploma in Performing Arts. His activities there included playing the title role in the college's production of Othello. He enrolled at the University of Greenwich to study for a BA in film studies and media writing, but dropped out to focus on his acting career. He trained with the Identity School of Acting in London, and became a patron of its Los Angeles branch when it opened in 2018.

== Career ==
=== 2011–2016: Early roles with blockbuster films ===
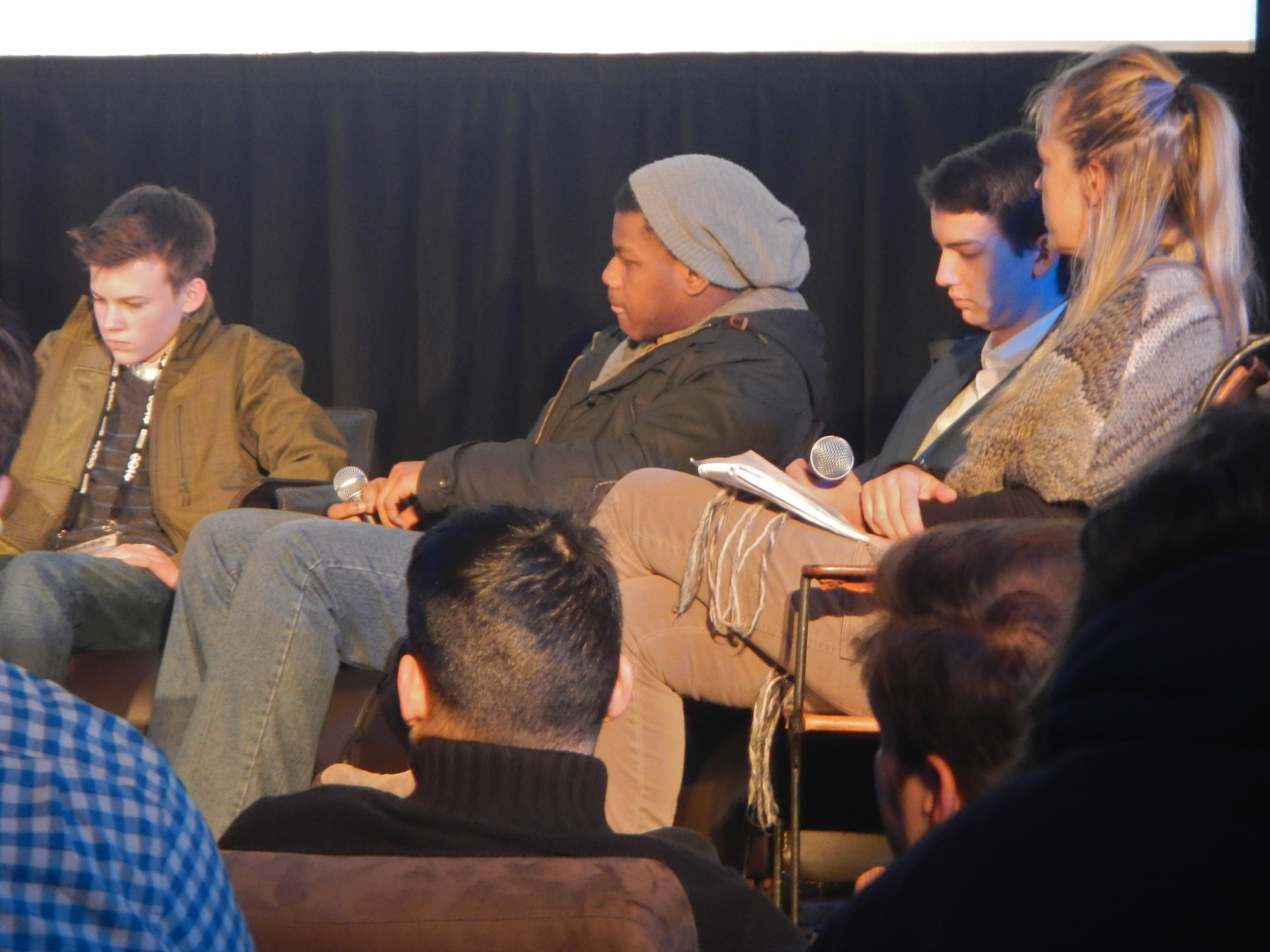
Sundance Film Festival, 2014: John Boyega (2nd from the left) with Josh Wiggins, Kodi Smit-McPhee, and Sharon Swart (from left to right)

Boyega trained at the Identity School of Acting in Hackney, and appeared in Six Parties at the National Theatre and Category B at the Tricycle Theatre prior to being offered a lead role in the 2011 cult classic film Attack the Block. In September 2011, HBO announced that Boyega had been cast in the boxing drama pilot Da Brick, loosely based on Mike Tyson's life. Boyega was expected to play Donnie, who is released from a juvenile detention centre on his 18th birthday and begins to examine what it means to be a man. The pilot, written by John Ridley, was not picked up by HBO. Also in 2011, Boyega was cast in the British drama film Junkhearts as Jamal, a drug dealer who finds some guns and tries to sell them.

Boyega was chosen by Fionnuala Halligan of Screen International as one of the "UK Stars of Tomorrow 2011" and appeared alongside two other actors on the cover of the magazine's July 2011 edition. In March 2012, he was cast in the film adaptation of Chimamanda Ngozi Adichie's book Half of a Yellow Sun. On 29 April 2014, it was confirmed that Boyega was cast as a primary character in Star Wars: The Force Awakens. It was later revealed that he would play Finn, a stormtrooper for the First Order, who, after witnessing their cruelty, leaves the military power and joins the fight against them. The film was released on 18 December 2015. The film and Boyega's performance were both acclaimed by critics and audiences. In January 2016, Boyega formed his own production company, UpperRoom Entertainment Limited.

=== 2017–present: Star Wars sequel trilogy and breakthrough ===
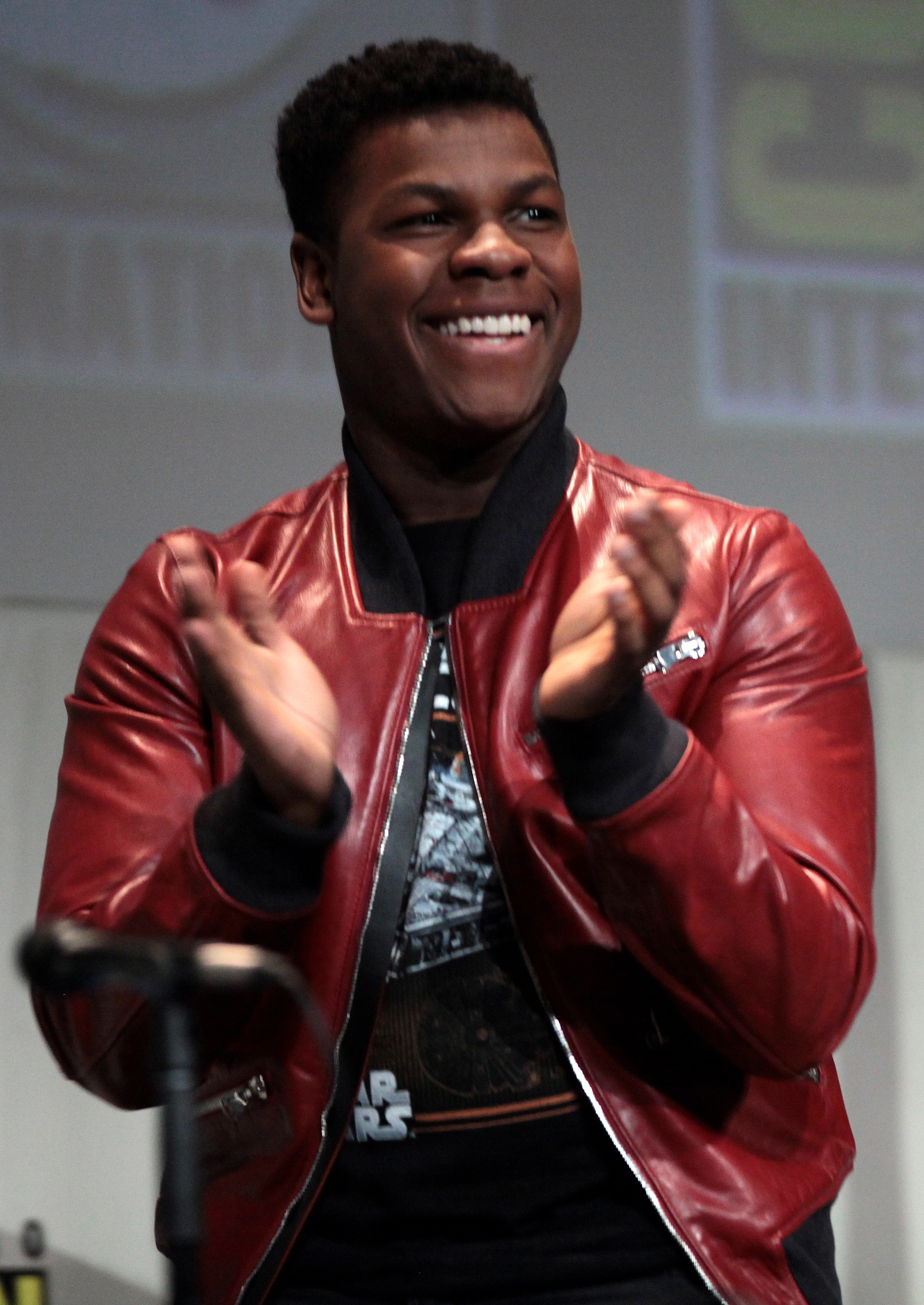
Boyega at the 2015 San Diego Comic Con

In 2017, Boyega played the part of a part-time security guard in Detroit, Kathryn Bigelow's film about the 1967 Detroit riots, and reprised his role as Finn in Star Wars: The Last Jedi. In 2018, Boyega's production company co-produced (with Legendary Entertainment) 2018's Pacific Rim: Uprising, the sequel to the 2013 movie Pacific Rim, in which he played the lead role of Jake Pentecost. In November 2018 it was announced that Boyega would star with Letitia Wright in a novel adaption of Hold Back the Stars. Boyega was also cast in Steve McQueen's miniseries Small Axe.

In 2019, Boyega teased his new collaboration with Writer/Director Sebastian Thiel, with whom he is developing a series based on their childhood experiences and that he would be producing. Boyega once again reprised his role as Finn in Star Wars: The Rise of Skywalker (2019), the final installment of the Star Wars sequel trilogy. In an interview on Good Morning America, he revealed that he had inadvertently left his script in a hotel room during filming. When it surfaced on eBay, it was bought by a Lucasfilm employee to prevent it from being leaked. In response to a tweet suggesting he should play the DC Comics character Static in a live-action role, Boyega said he would be too old for the role, and that he would be interested in seeing a newcomer receive it. He did, however, express interest in playing the DC character Red Hood.

In the 2020 and 2021 editions of the Powerlist, Boyega was listed in the Top 100 of the most influential people in the UK of African/African-Caribbean descent. He was cited as one of the Top 100 most influential Africans by New African magazine in 2020. More recently, his production company UpperRoom made a first-look deal with VIS Kids. While filming the Netflix film Rebel Ridge, he unexpectedly walked out mid-production due to family issues. In 2022, Boyega was the lead in Abi Damaris Corbin's second feature film, Breaking, which premiered at the 2022 Sundance Film Festival under its original title, 892, as well as Gina Prince-Bythewood's historical epic The Woman King alongside Viola Davis, Thuso Mbedu, and Lashana Lynch. Boyega next starred in Netflix's science-fiction comedy They Cloned Tyrone, playing the titular character and multiple other characters.

In May 2021, it was announced that he would re-team with Joe Cornish in a sequel for Attack the Block. In October 2024, it was announced that Boyega is set to star as American singer Otis Redding, opposite Danielle Deadwyler as Redding's wife, Zelma, in an upcoming biographical film titled Otis & Zelma.

== Activism and advocacy ==
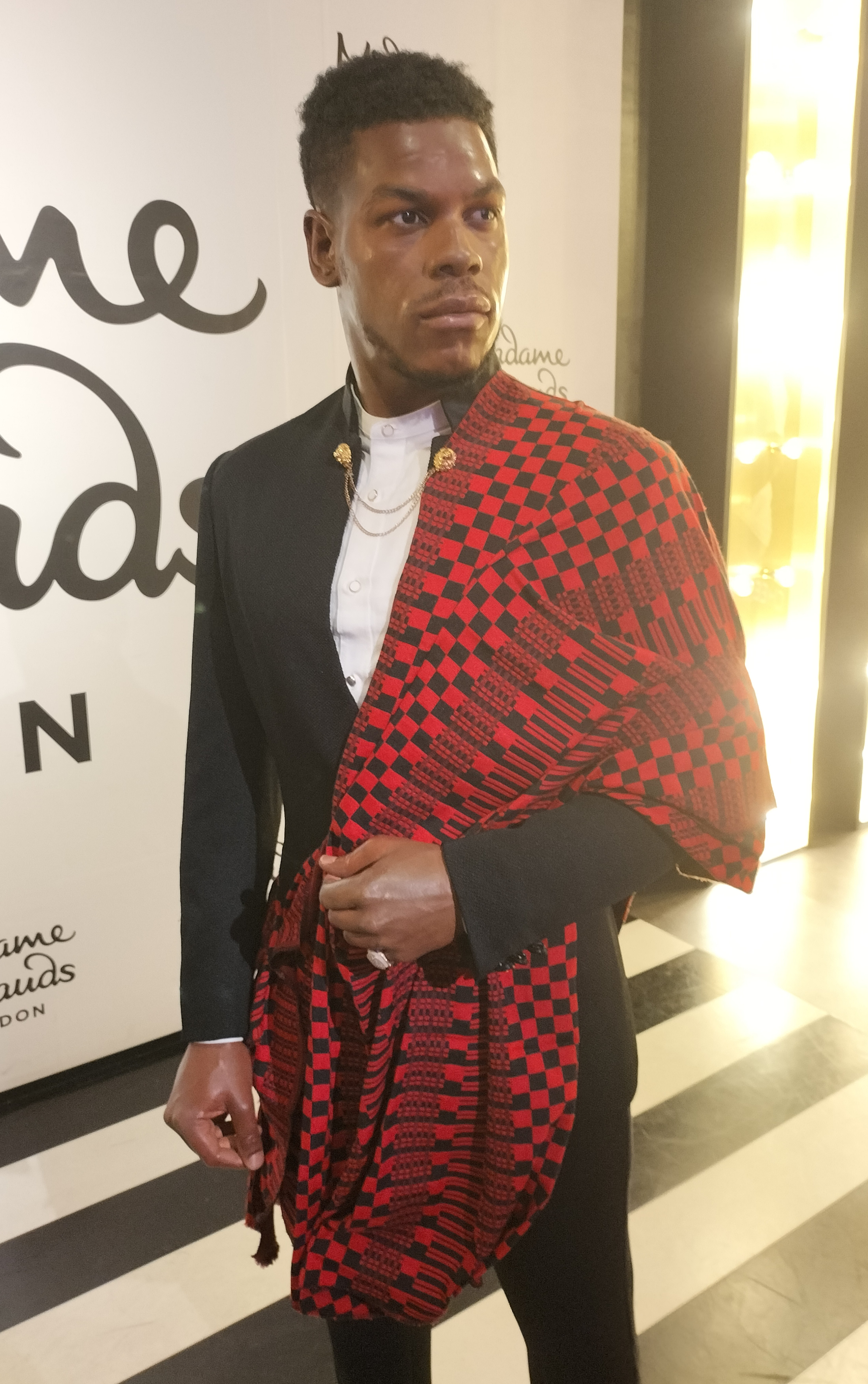
A wax figure of Boyega at Madame Tussauds, London

Boyega expressed solidarity with George Floyd, Sandra Bland, Trayvon Martin, and Stephen Lawrence during a speech at a Black Lives Matter rally in Hyde Park, London. His gesture was supported by a number of celebrities, and Lucasfilm also reiterated their support for Boyega and the Black Lives Matter movement.

In a 2020 interview with British GQ, Boyega openly criticised Disney for sidelining his character Finn in the Star Wars sequel trilogy: "[W]hat I would say to Disney is do not bring out a black character, market them to be much more important in the franchise than they are and then have them pushed to the side. It's not good. I'll say it straight up."

== Personal life ==
In an interview with The Guardian in October 2026, Boyega has stated that he has been married "up to two years now" with a baby on the way.

== Filmography ==
=== Film ===
Year	Title	Role	Notes	Ref.
2011	Attack the Block	Moses		
2011	Junkhearts	Jamal		
2013	Half of a Yellow Sun	Ugwu		
2014	Imperial Dreams	Bambi		
2015	Star Wars: The Force Awakens	FN-2187 / Finn		
2017	The Circle	Ty		
2017	Detroit	Melvin Dismukes		
2017	Star Wars: The Last Jedi	Finn		
2018	Pacific Rim Uprising	Jake Pentecost	Also producer	
2019	Star Wars: The Rise of Skywalker	Finn		
2021	Naked Singularity	Casi		
2022	Breaking	Brian Brown-Easley	Also producer	
2022	The Woman King	King Ghezo		
2023	They Cloned Tyrone	Fontaine		
TBA	Slime †	TBA (voice)	In production	
TBA	The Punishing †	TBA	Post-production	
TBA	Attack the Block 2 †	Moses	In production; also producer	
TBA	The Freshening †		In production; also Producer	
TBA	Otis & Zelma †	Otis	In production; also executive producer	

=== Television ===
Year	Title	Role	Notes
2011	Da Brick	Donnie	Pilot
2011	Becoming Human	Danny Curtis	4 episodes
2011	Law & Order: UK	Jamal Clarkson	Episode: "Survivor's Guilt"
2012	My Murder	Shakilus Townsend	Television film
2013	The Whale	William Bond	Television film
2014	24: Live Another Day	Chris Tanner	4 episodes
2015	Major Lazer	Blkmrkt	Voice; 10 episodes
2015	Saturday Night Live	Himself	Segment: "Star Wars Auditions"
2016	Tinkershrimp & Dutch	Dutch	Voice; 5 episodes
2017–2018	Star Wars Forces of Destiny	Finn	Voice; 2 episodes
2018	Watership Down	Bigwig	Voice; 4 episodes
2019	Serengeti	Narrator	Voice; 5 episodes
2020	Small Axe	Leroy Logan	Episode: "Red, White and Blue"
2023	World War II: From the Frontlines	Narrator	Voice; 6 episodes
2025	Love, Death & Robots	Slash	Voice; episode: "400 Boys"
TBA	Damilola Taylor: The Last 24 Hours (w/t)	Himself	Upcoming documentary

=== Stage ===
Year	Title	Role	Theatre	Ref.
2009	Six Parties	Ben	Royal National Theatre, London	
2009	Category B	Reece	Kiln Theatre, London	
2009	Seize the Day	Sam	Kiln Theatre, London	
2009	Detaining Justice	Guard / Passer-by	Kiln Theatre, London	
2017	Woyzeck	Woyzeck	The Old Vic, London	

=== Podcasts ===
Year	Title	Role	Notes
2021	Tomorrow's Monsters	Jack Locke	Also producer

=== Video games ===
Year	Title	Role	Notes
2015	Disney Infinity 3.0	Finn	Voice
2016	Lego Star Wars: The Force Awakens	Finn	Voice
2017	Star Wars Battlefront II	Finn	Voice

=== Theme park attractions ===
Year	Title	Role	Notes
2015	Star Tours – The Adventures Continue	Finn	Scene added for seasonal Season of the Force promotion
2019	Star Wars: Rise of the Resistance	Finn	Disney's Hollywood Studios
2020	Star Wars: Rise of the Resistance	Finn	Disneyland

== Awards and recognition ==
Year	Award	Category	Project	Result	Ref.
2011	Black Reel Award	Best Actor	Attack the Block	Won	
2011	Black Reel Award	Best Breakthrough Performance	Attack the Block	Nominated	
2011	Black Reel Award	Best Ensemble	Attack the Block	Nominated	
2011	British Independent Film Awards	Most Promising Newcomer	Attack the Block	Nominated	
2011	Empire Award	Best Male Newcomer	Attack the Block	Nominated	
2011	Evening Standard British Film Awards	Most Promising Newcomer	Attack the Block	Nominated	
2011	London Film Critics' Circle	Young British Performer of the Year	Attack the Block	Nominated	
2015	British Academy Film Award	Rising Star Award	Himself	Won	
2015	Empire Award	Best Male Newcomer	Star Wars: The Force Awakens	Won	
2015	Georgia Film Critics Association	Best Ensemble	Star Wars: The Force Awakens	Nominated	
2015	MTV Movie Awards	Best Breakthrough Performance	Star Wars: The Force Awakens	Nominated	
2015	MTV Movie Awards	Best Action Performance	Star Wars: The Force Awakens	Nominated	
2015	MTV Movie Awards	Best Ensemble	Star Wars: The Force Awakens	Nominated	
2015	Kids' Choice Awards	Favorite Movie Actor	Star Wars: The Force Awakens	Nominated	
2015	Saturn Award	Best Actor	Star Wars: The Force Awakens	Nominated	
2017	Empire Award	Best Actor	Star Wars: The Last Jedi	Nominated	
2017	Teen Choice Award	Best Movie Actor – Sci-Fi/Fantasy	Star Wars: The Last Jedi	Nominated	
2020	Critics' Choice Television Award	Best Actor in a Limited Series or TV Movie	Small Axe	Won	
2020	Golden Globe Awards	Best Supporting Actor – Television	Small Axe	Won	
2020	London Film Critics' Circle	British/Irish Actor of the Year	Small Axe	Nominated	
2020	Satellite Awards	Best Actor in a Miniseries or TV Film	Small Axe	Nominated	
2021	British Academy Television Awards	Best Actor	Small Axe	Nominated	
