= Killing of Archie Elliott III =

1993 police killing in Maryland

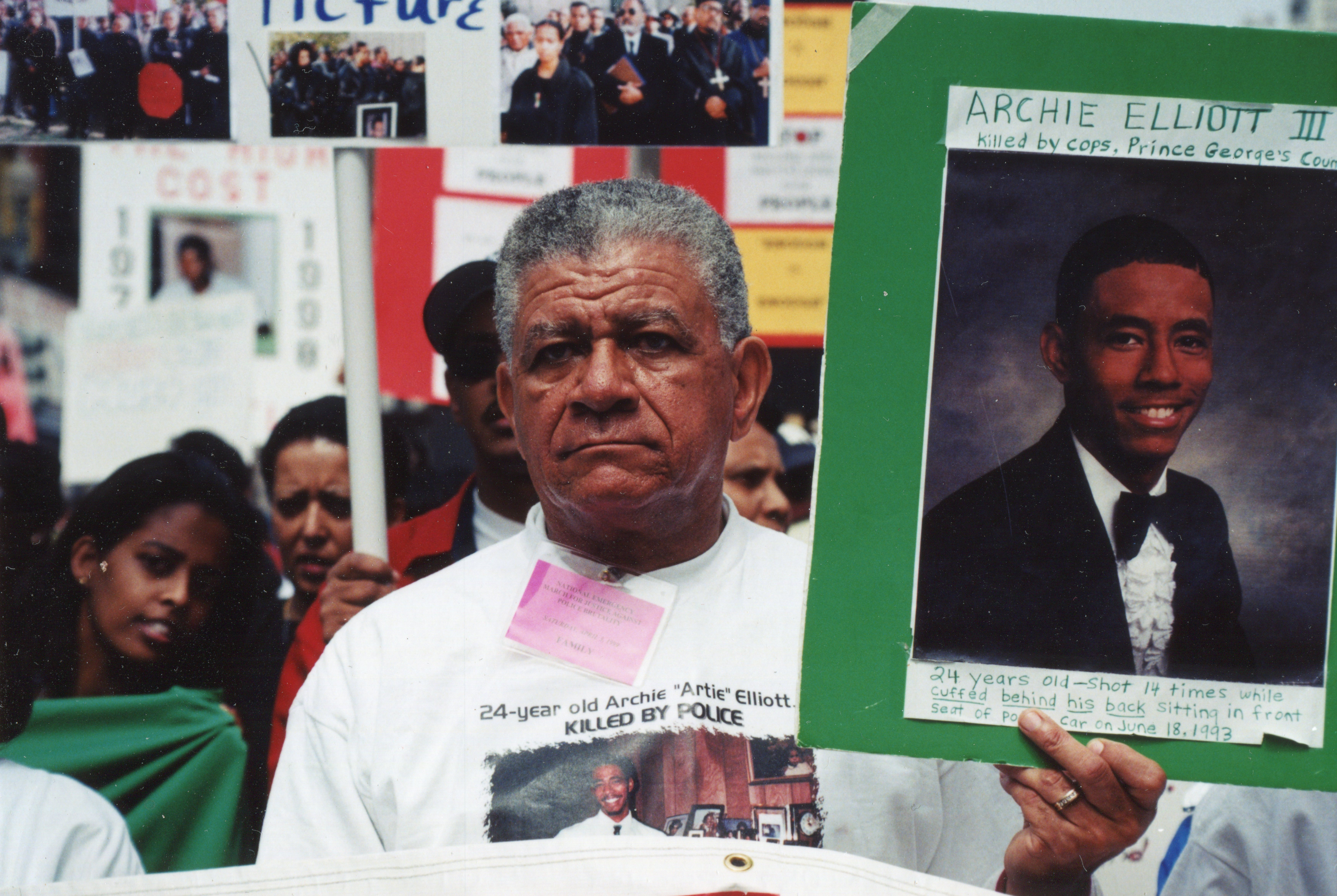
- Archie Elliott Jr., the father of Archie Elliott III, during the National Emergency March for Justice Against Police Brutality in April 1999
- Date: June 18, 1993
- Location: District Heights, Maryland, U.S.
- Deaths: Archie Elliott III

The killing of Archie Elliott III, a black 24-year-old, occurred on June 18, 1993, in District Heights, Maryland. Police Officer Jason Leavitt spotted Elliott driving erratically and pulled him over on suspicion of driving under the influence. Leavitt handcuffed Elliott and placed him in the front seat of his police vehicle. Officer Wayne Cheney arrived on scene, and the two officers claim to have seen Elliott point a small revolver at them, although his father and several witnesses dispute that he owned a gun. They opened fire on Elliott, killing him.

== Background ==
Archie "Artie" Elliott III was born to Dorothy Copp Elliott, a school teacher, and Archie Elliott Jr., a trial court judge in Portsmouth, Virginia, on December 8, 1968. His parents met at Virginia State University in the 1960s. After the death of Martin Luther King Jr., Elliott Jr. left his position as Assistant Provost Marshal at Fort Bragg in order to attend law school with the goal of becoming a civil rights lawyer. While he was in law school, they learned of Dorothy's pregnancy. As a child, Elliott was shy, but liked to joke and dance. His parents divorced while he was still young. Elliott Jr. stayed in Portsmouth to pursue his legal career, and Elliott III moved with Dorothy to the Washington, D.C. area to be closer to Dorothy's side of the family. Elliott spent most of his childhood with his mother in Forestville, Maryland, seeing his father once a month. He lived with his father in Portsmouth for the last two years of high school.

After graduating high school, Elliott worked in construction and learned masonry, hoping to become a bricklayer and to one day build his mother a new home. Elliott later decided to follow in his parents' footsteps and attend college at Virginia State University, where he majored in business administration, eventually moving back to Forestville. At the time of his death, Elliott was working in construction and living in Forestville.

== Shooting ==
On June 18, 1993, Archie Elliott III was on his way home to Forestville, Maryland, from work at a construction job in Virginia. While Elliott was driving through District Heights, Maryland, Officer Jason Leavitt noticed a car driving erratically and pulled it over at the corner of Marbury Drive and Kipling Parkway. Leavitt had Elliott perform field sobriety tests, which he failed. Leavitt then handcuffed Elliott behind the back and sat him in the front seat of his police vehicle to wait for backup. Elliott was wearing jean shorts and sneakers, but no shirt or socks, and Leavitt did not properly search him. He was approximately 6 ft 1 in and 165 lbs. Elliott was buckled into the passenger seat and the car window was closed. Shortly after Leavitt placed Elliott in the police cruiser, Officer Wayne Cheney, from Prince George's County, arrived on scene. The officers claimed that they noticed Elliott III pointing a .22 caliber revolver at them and ordered him to stop. They stated that he did not stop, so they shot him, resulting in his death.

== Aftermath ==
=== Investigation ===
Preliminary reports indicated that officers fired five to ten shots at Elliott. A spokesman for the Prince George's County Police Department said that both officers had fired semi-automatic handguns. The District Heights Police Chief Michael Convoy said officers "are taught to shoot to kill" if they believe their safety is in jeopardy. One officer was white and the other was black. Both were placed on leave with pay during the investigation. Convoy also stated "Our sympathies go out to the family, but they also go out to the police officers. Most people forget that side of it."

On June 23, 1993, U.S. Representative for Virginia Bobby Scott released a statement calling for a federal investigation of the shooting, sending a letter to U.S. Attorney General Janet Reno suggesting that the Department of Justice should "determine if the shooting of Mr. Elliott violated his civil rights" and whether it "reflects any pattern or practice of police misconduct." On June 24, the Federal Bureau of Investigation announced that the agency would investigate Elliott's death.

Elliott's father, Archie Elliott Jr., also declared that he would take leave from his work as a judge to conduct his own investigation, planning to do door-to-door canvassing of the neighborhood. Elliott Jr. stated that he had heard from several witnesses who saw no gun near his son and he had never known his son to own a gun. Elliott's mother and best friend also stated they did not know him to own a gun. When Elliott Jr. went to the funeral home to view Elliott III's body, his nephew counted 18 to 21 bullet wounds and "bruises galore." Elliott Jr. spent approximately three weeks investigating on his own.

One witness who lived at the corner where Elliott was shot told a reporter that "It was more than five shots but not more than eight or so. I'm certain it wasn't." She stated that she was upstairs with her husband when they heard a series of popping sounds. The witness then ran outside and saw Elliott bloody and lying on the street next to the police cruiser. She said that the police still had their guns pulled and were not rendering any aid to Elliott. Approximately eight minutes later, additional officers arrived on scene, but no ambulance. The witness went inside and called the rescue squad herself.

A police report stated that Elliott was initially pulled over on suspicion of driving under the influence and had admitted to officers that he had been drinking. Police claimed that Elliott had been fumbling with a revolver and that an unloaded revolver was found on the floor of the police cruiser with fibers on it matching Elliott's jeans. Elliott's hands were handcuffed behind his back.

An investigation revealed that he officers had discharged their weapons twenty-two times, and Elliott was shot fourteen times. The Maryland State Chief Medical Examiner stated that Elliott had sustained his injuries on the right side of the passenger side-door.

The county prosecutor at the time, Alex Williams, did not indict the officers after a grand jury found that there was not enough evidence. Twenty months after Elliott was shot, Officer Cheney shot and killed an unarmed person during another traffic stop.

=== Community response ===
Elliott's funeral was attended by more than 1,000 people, including U.S. representative Bobby Scott, judge Johnny E. Morrison, and Virginia state delegate Kenneth R. Melvin.

Following the failure to indict, Elliott's mother began holding weekly protests at the Prince George's County Courthouse and organized a march to the state capital, Annapolis. For more than a year, activists picketed outside the courthouse in an attempt to get the state's attorney to reopen the case for an independent investigation. Dick Gregory, Al Sharpton, and Martin Luther King III participated.

WOL (AM) talk-radio host and activist Joe Madison stated that the shooting "was a travesty of abuse of police power." Madison was sued by the police officers after he referred to the shooting as "murder" on his show.

Two years after Elliott's death, his family started a scholarship fund, giving scholarships to students attending historically black colleges and universities. Thirty years after Elliott's death, The Washington Post ran an obituary for him, asking for donations for the scholarship fund.

In February 1993, Amadou Diallo was shot and killed by police officers in New York City. The protests that followed once again drew attention to Elliott's case, with Madison proclaiming that he would go on a hunger strike until Elliott's case was reopened.

In August 2020, amid Black Lives Matter protests, Dorothy Copp Elliott and the Archie Elliott the III Coalition of Justice again called for police to reopen Elliott's case, collecting thousands of signatures in support. In 2021, the state's attorney at the time, Aisha Braveboy, conducted an independent review and came to the conclusion not to pursue charges. A spokesperson for the office stated that many of the Elliott files had been "misplaced" prior to their administration. Braveboy's administration also maintained a "Brady list" of 39 local police officers who were not reliable witnesses in court. The Archie Elliott the III Coalition of Justice demanded to see the list, hoping to determine if any of the officers in Elliott's case were on the list.

== Civil lawsuit ==
Elliott's family filed an excessive force lawsuit, which was dismissed. Elliott's mother appealed this decision to the United States Court of Appeals for the Fourth Circuit in Richmond, Virginia, but they dismissed the case after determining that Elliott had threatened the officers. They then appealed to the Supreme Court of the United States, which declined to hear the case.
