= Leroy Logan =

London Metropolitan Police officer

Leroy Logan MBE
- Born: London, England
- Education: University of East London
- Occupations: Author, Police officer
- Known for: Chair of the Black Police Association
- Awards: MBE

Leroy Hugh Logan MBE is a former police superintendent in the UK. He was both a founding member of the Black Police Association and its chairman for 30 years.

Logan left the Metropolitan Police at the rank of superintendent having been involved in the Stephen Lawrence Inquiry, the inquiry into the killing of Damilola Taylor and the organisation of the London 2012 Olympics.

In 2020, Logan published his first book Closing Ranks, My Life as a Cop which described his time as a senior police officer in London. Red, White and Blue, a dramatisation of Logan's decision to join and of his early time in the police service, was broadcast on BBC One in the United Kingdom and Amazon Prime in the United States in winter 2020. Logan was played by the actor John Boyega.

== Early life and education ==
Born in Islington, London, to Jamaican parents, Logan attended Highbury Grove School for secondary education and Hackney Community College where he studied biology, chemistry and physics for A-Level. After leaving school, he attended the University of East London from 1976 to 1980 where he earned a BSc degree in applied biology. In 2013, the University of East London awarded Logan an honorary PhD for his services to policing.

== Career ==
Logan joined the police force in 1983, having previously worked as a research scientist. He was inspired to join the police after witnessing two officers assault his father.

Logan was described by The Voice newspaper as "one of the Black officers who helped change the Met". In 2000, he was appointed a Member of the Order of the British Empire (MBE) for services to the Police Service and to community relations.

As chair of the Black Police Association, he was involved in the Stephen Lawrence inquiry and the inquiry into the killing of Damilola Taylor. Logan retired as a police officer in 2013. He remains an executive member of the National Black Police Association and is a founder member of the Black Police Association Charitable Trust.

== Personal life ==
In 2003, Logan was awarded £100,000 by the Metropolitan Police following an investigation over a hotel bill. His autobiography, Closing Ranks: My Life as a Cop, was published in 2020.

== In popular culture ==
Logan is portrayed by John Boyega in the episode “Red, White and Blue” of Small Axe, an anthology TV series created by Steve McQueen.

== Honours ==

| Ribbon | Description | Notes |
| | Order of the British Empire (MBE) | Member.; Civil Division.; For services to the Police Service and to community relations.; 2000 New Years Honours List. |
| | Queen Elizabeth II Golden Jubilee Medal | 2002; UK Version of this Medal |
| | Queen Elizabeth II Diamond Jubilee Medal | 2012; UK Version of this Medal |
| | Police Long Service and Good Conduct Medal | |

=== Scholastic ===
Honorary degrees

| Location | Date | University | Degree | Gave address |
|---|---|---|---|---|
| England | 20 November 2013 | University of East London | Doctorate | Yes |
