= Archie Elliott Jr. =

American judge

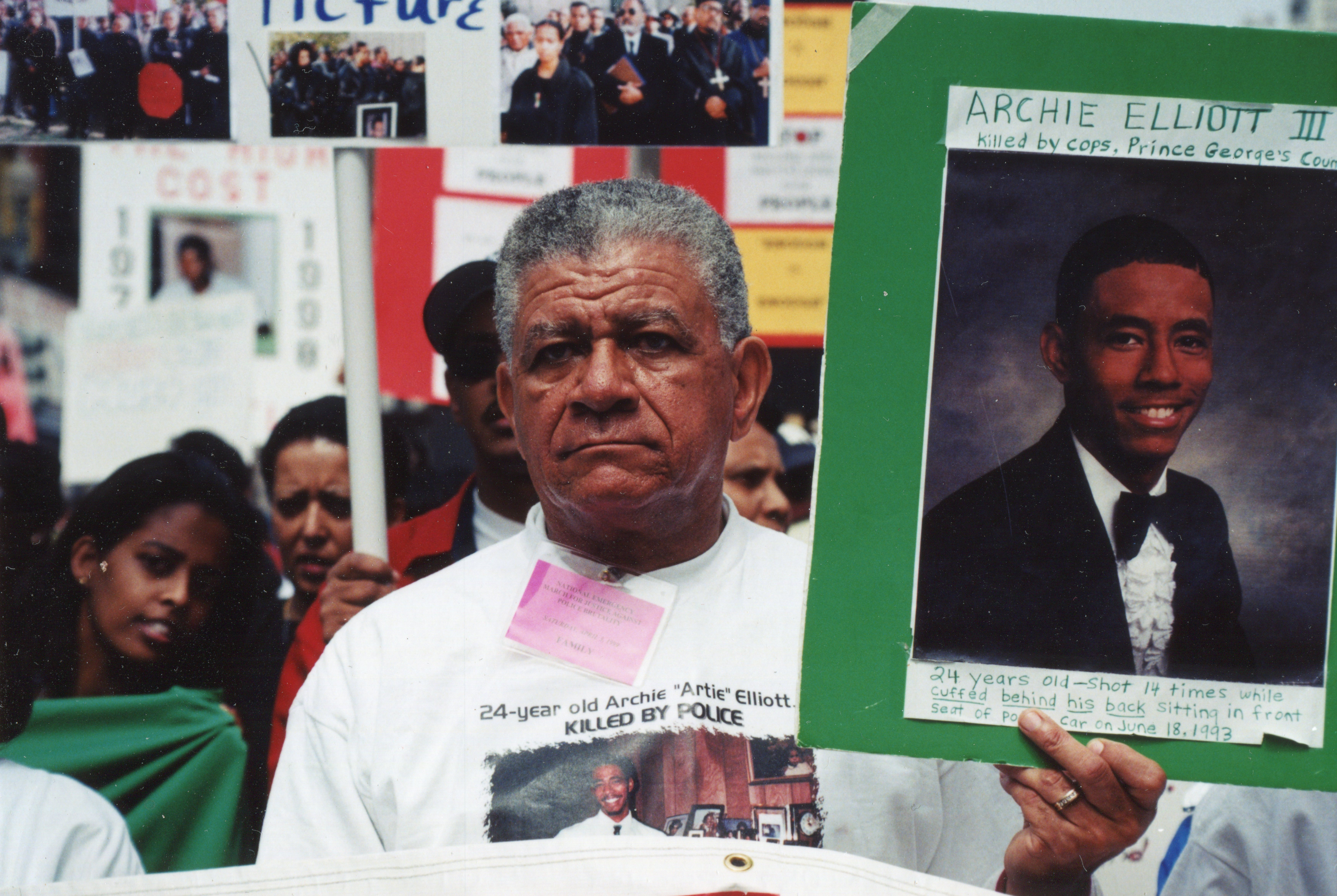
- Elliott holds up a picture of his son, Archie Elliott III, during the National Emergency March for Justice Against Police Brutality in April 1999

General District Court Judge
- In office 1974–2006

Personal details
- Spouse: Dorothy Copp (div.)
- Children: 1
- Education: Virginia State University; North Carolina Central University School of Law
- Occupation: Judge, General District Court

Archie Elliott Jr. is an African-American retired judge and lawyer from Portsmouth, Virginia. He served as a judge in the Portsmouth General District Court from 1974 until 2006.

== Early life and education ==
Elliott attended the historically black Virginia State University in the 1960s. Upon graduating, Elliott served in the military during the Vietnam War. After the death of Martin Luther King Jr., Elliott left his position as Assistant Provost Marshal at Fort Bragg in order to attend law school with the goal of becoming a civil rights lawyer. He attended the predominantly black North Carolina Central University School of Law.

== Career ==
Following his graduation from law school, Elliott established a law firm in Portsmouth, Virginia. He was the first black attorney in the city in twenty-five years. Elliott served on the Portsmouth City Council. In 1974, Elliott became a judge in the Portsmouth General District Court.

In 2004, Elliott believed himself to be due for a term as chief judge. The position was generally rotated among jurists. Instead, Morton Whitlow was elected to another term of chief judge. Elliott wrote letters following the decision, claiming that racism was a factor in the decision, as both of the other general district court judges were white. The two judges took Elliott's letter as a threat and filed complaints with the Judicial Inquiry and Review Commission. Elliott was accused of lying to defendants about a "DEA light," which he told them could determine if they had recently used drugs. The judges had been previously visited by Virginia Supreme Court justice Leroy R. Hassell Sr., who encouraged them to work out their differences. Judge Whitlow requested a bulletproof vest from the state due to the threats, and his request was granted. On August 26, 2004, the Judicial Inquiry and Review Commission suspended Elliott for an investigation into the allegations. Elliott remained suspended from the bench for nearly two years. Elliott issued apology letters to Whitlow and others. A minority of the Virginia Supreme Court found Elliott's actions worthy of official sanctions. The court instead ordered Elliott to be reinstated for one day and asked that he retire on June 30, 2006. Police and deputies filled his courtroom on his last day and gave him a standing ovation.

In 2007, Elliott began serving as assistant chief for the Nottoway Indian Tribe of Virginia.

== Personal life ==
Elliott met Dorothy Copp at Virginia State University in the 1960s. Their son, Archie Elliott III, was born on December 8, 1968. Elliott and Copp divorced while Elliott III was still young. Elliott Jr. stayed in Portsmouth to pursue his legal career, and Elliott III moved with Dorothy to the Washington, D.C. area to be closer to Dorothy's side of the family. Elliott III spent most of his childhood with his mother in Forestville, Maryland, seeing his father once a month. He lived with his father in Portsmouth for the last two years of high school. On June 18, 1993, Archie Elliott III was shot and killed by police officers while handcuffed in police cruiser. Since then, Elliott has been engaged in activism related to his son's death.

Elliott is close friends with Johnny E. Morrison.
