= Johnny E. Morrison =

American judge

Personal details
- Spouse: Cynthia P. Morrison
- Occupation: Judge, Circuit Court

Johnny E. Morrison is a judge for the Third Circuit of Virginia and the chief judge for the Portsmouth City Circuit Court.

== Career ==
In 2015, Morrison was reelected for an eight-year term.

In September 2019, Morrison approved the condemnation of the buildings at the Portsmouth Civic Center Complex, but allowed the Portsmouth City Jail located at the complex to continue operating. The city sheriff argued that it was the city's job to maintain the jail and stated the city had not maintained the building. In January 2020, Morrison ruled that the city could not close the jail, stating that the jail must be "repaired and maintained." In March 2020, the Portsmouth City Council voted 4-3 in favor of closing the jail due to its poor conditions. Following the vote, Morrison ruled once again that the jail could not be closed, despite the decision of the city council.

== Personal life ==
In 2021, Morrison received a kidney transplant after his next-door neighbor, Virginia House of Delegates member Don Scott donated one of his kidneys to Morrison. He is married to Cynthia P. Morrison, who serves as the Clerk of the Portsmouth City Circuit Court.
