= National Black Police Association (United States) =

United States federation of racial justice interest groups

The National Black Police Association (NBPA) is a national organisation of sub-regional African American Police Associations who are dedicated to promoting justice, fairness, and effectiveness in law enforcement. The NBPA has several chartered organisations throughout the United States and has associate members abroad, in Canada, Bermuda, and the United Kingdom. It is headquartered in Dallas, Texas.

== History ==
The National Black Police Association was founded in November 1972. It was started after a meeting in St. Louis, Missouri where over thirteen different African American Peace Associations were present. The representatives came from areas that discriminated against African Americans. Ever since, the National Black Police Association has been working to help and improve the relationship between Police Departments and minority communities, help evaluate how effective policies and programs within the Criminal Justice System affect the minority community, help recruit minorities to a career in Police Service, work toward reform in the areas of police corruption, brutality, and racial discrimination, and to help educate police officers to work with a sense of professionalism and compassion.

== Structure ==
The National Black Police Association has five regions in the United States, Eastern, Southern, Northern, Western and Midwest. In each region, there is an elected President and an appointed Informational Officer which represent their region in the National meeting. At the National meeting members of the regional departments serve as the Board of Directors for the association where they monitor national funds, projects and programs of the organization. The national board then votes for one member to serve as the Executive Director of the organization. The National Black Police Association has a national conference every year where members from around the nation meet to discuss the work of the association.

== Membership ==
To gain membership, a person must pay a one-time $100.00 fee and whatever monthly fees are further on charged by the organisation. Members of the NBPA receive access to events and conferences to advance their training and also receive a membership card which allows them discounts for air travel and hotels along with an Official Lapel Pin.

== Political positions ==
- Community Policing: The NBPA supports the philosophy of Community Policing that calls for a true, cooperative partnership between the Community and the Police for safer communities.
- Control of Narcotics: The NBPA believes that the influx of hard narcotics into this country can only be controlled by a joint effort between the supplying country and the federal government.
- Crime Prevention: The NBPA supports the allocation of more national and local crime fighting resources toward the prevention of crime.
- Capital Punishment: The NBPA protests the application of capital punishment in all instances. The NBPA feels that capital punishment is un-American, unjust, and unconstitutional.
- Handgun Control: The NBPA supports national handgun legislation prohibiting further manufacturing of handguns and limiting their sales, possession, and use.
- Police Brutality: The NBPA believes Police brutality must be confronted, controlled, and outlawed by all police departments throughout the United States.
- Police Officer Residency: The NBPA believes Police should be required and have their official residency in the city or municipality in which they are employed.
- Women in Police Work: The NBPA supports women as equal and equitable partners in the field of law enforcement, and believes them capable of performing equally as well as their male counterparts.
