= National Black Police Association (United Kingdom) =

Racial justice interest group

The National Black Police Association (NBPA) is an interest group of the Black and Minority Ethnic (BME) staff of UK police forces, founded in November 1999. The association seeks to improve their working environment, to challenge racial prejudice, and to enhance the quality of service to non-white communities of the United Kingdom.

The association defines itself as follows:

The objective of the National Black Police Association (NBPA) is to promote good race relations and equality of opportunity within the police services of the United Kingdom and the wider community.

The NBPA works to place fairness at the heart of the Police Agenda. We do this by taking forward initiatives for the Progression of minority officers and staff; such as mentoring schemes, leadership programmes, women in policing projects supported by the National Institute for Leadership and Empowerment. The NBPA has a high Profile within the Home Office and Government Strategic Committees. As well as members of a range of decision-making steering groups, we have regular meetings with the all policing stakeholders.

The NBPA does not have individual membership. It is made up by BPAs who each elect a representative to participate at national level on the National Executive Committee (NEC). The NBPA has been criticised by right-wing figures as a racist organisation because of its selective membership criteria based on ethnic origin.

== Black Police Association ==
The first Black Police Association (BPA) was the Metropolitan Black Police Association, founded in 1994 as a joint initiative between BME police staff within the Metropolitan Police Service (MPS).

This joint initiative raised concerns about the number of black staff who were leaving police forces throughout the UK. A meeting of BME staff from the MPS, known as the Bristol Seminars, led to the formation of a black support network, which formally became the UK's first Black Police Association in September 1994, launched by the MPS Commissioner Sir Paul Condon. At the launch, Condon said: "I have made it clear where I stand. I see the formation of this Association as the only way forward."

On 12 and 13 October 2006, UC Berkeley School of Law, part of the University of California, hosted an international, multidisciplinary roundtable on the role of rank-and-file officers in police reform. The roundtable was co-sponsored by the Berkeley Center for Criminal Justice, the Center for the Study of Law & Society, and the Regulatory Institutions Network at Australian National University. Included in the list of invited contributors was Superintendent Paul Wilson, Metropolitan Police Service, London, who presented his paper entitled "The development and role of a Black Police Association in the wider police modernisation agenda" which gives an insight into the socio-political beginnings of the UK's first black police association.

== Criticism ==
Ali Dizaei, the former National President of National Black Police Association, was jailed for perverting the course of justice in February 2010. Anjana Ahuja, a British Asian reporter for The Times, criticised the organisation for its vocal defence of Dizaei and called for its disbandment, calling it "pointless and possibly harmful", and asked "why partition members of the same profession along the lines of skin colour?"

Minette Marrin called the NBPA "racism in action", saying "if anything is institutionally racist, in the strict sense of the term, it is the existence of the NBPA itself: it is a separatist union for officers who call themselves black."

Conservative MP David Davies - a white man - criticised the organisation, while speaking as a guest at a NBPA meeting, for not allowing white people to become full members, saying: "To me it is a shame that full membership of the BPA is open only to those of black, Asian or Middle Eastern origin".

== National Communication Network ==
In October 1996, a National Communication Network was formed. This network included BME police staff members throughout the UK, and soon after its formation, members of the network resolved that a national association of BME police staff members should be formed, with the motto: "One voice, strength in unity".

In early 1998, four representatives of the National Communication Network met with Home Secretary Jack Straw. Three representatives from the Metropolitan Police BPA, The chairman, Paul Wilson, Executive members Leroy Logan and Bevan Powell were accompanied by Ravi Chand Chairman of the Bedfordshire Police BPA. It was at this meeting that the Home Secretary volunteered to speak at the Met BPA Annual General Meeting, an offer which was accepted by the chairman, Paul Wilson. From this initial meeting and other meetings between the Home Office and representatives of the National Communications Network, in November 1998, the first interim executive committee of the National Black Police Association was elected to launch the NBPA. The executive committee had 14 executive members from 12 Constabularies.

In October 2009 Charles Crichlow, a Greater Manchester Police Officer, was elected President of the NBPA.

In October 2013 a new Cabinet was elected. Franstine Jones, a Suffolk member of police staff was elected as the NBPA's first female President, with Nick Glynn (Leicestershire) being elected as Vice-President and Janet Hills as Chair.

In October 2023, at its annual conference in Cardiff, the NBPA discussed the National Police Chiefs Council's National Race Action Plan concerned that it had not been given priority.

== See also ==
- Black people
- Racism within the British police
