= Bertha =

- Gender: Female

Origin
- Meaning: "Bright one"

Bertha is a female Germanic name, from Old High German berhta meaning "bright one". It was usually a short form of Anglo Saxon names Beorhtgifu meaning "bright gift" or Beorhtwynn meaning "bright joy".

The name occurs as a theonym, surviving as Berchta, a figure in Alpine folklore connected to the Wild Hunt, probably an epithet of *Frijjō in origin.

Bertha appears as a Frankish given name from as early as the 6th century. The monothematic Bertha as a given name may, however, not originate with the theonym but rather as a short form of dithematic given names including the "bright" element. This is notably the case with the mother of Charlemagne, Bertrada (properly berht-rada "bright counsel") called "Bertha Broadfoot". Carolingian uses of the name Bertha, as in the case of Bertha, daughter of Charlemagne and Bertha, daughter of Lothair II, are in this tradition.

In modern times, the name is associated with an unusually large example of a class of objects. Many large machines are nicknamed Bertha for the World War I howitzer known as Big Bertha.

== People ==
- Saint Bertha of Kent (539 – c. 612), Queen of Kent
- Saint Bertha of Val d'Or (d. c. 690), abbess
- Saint Bertha of Artois (mid-7th century – 4 July 725), abbess, daughter of Count Rigobert and Ursana
- Bertrada of Laon (also called Bertha with the big feet) (720–783), Frankish queen
- Saint Bertha of Bingen (fl. c. 757), mother of Saint Rupert of Bingen
- Bertha, daughter of Charlemagne (c. 780 – after 11 March 824)
- Bertha, daughter of Lothair II (863–925)
- Bertha-Eudokia of Provence (died 949), Byzantine empress
- Blessed Bertha de Bardi, Florence; (died 24 March 1163)
- Bertha, Duchess of Brittany (c. 1114 – 1156)
- Bertha, Duchess of Lorraine (b.c. 1123/30 – d. 1194/5)
- Bertha of Aragon (c. 1075 – bef. 1111), Queen consort of Aragon and Navarre
- Bertha of Burgundy (952, 964 or 967 – 1010, 16 January 1016, or 1035), queen of France
- Bertha of Hereford (born c. 1130), heiress
- Bertha of Holland (c. 1055 – 1093), queen of France
- Bertha of Milan (c. 997-c. 1040), countess margravine of Turin
- Bertha of Putelendorf (died 1190), Saxon noble
- Bertha of Rheinfelden (born c. 1065; d. after 1128), countess of Kellmünz
- Bertha of Savoy (1051–1087), Queen of Germany
- Bertha of Sulzbach (1110–1159), Byzantine empress
- Bertha of Swabia (c. 907 – 966), queen of Burgundy
- Bertha of Turin (c.1020/4 – after 1064/5), member of the Arduinici dynasty
- Bertha of Val d'Or (died c. 690), a Christian saint
- Bertha of Vohburg (13th-century), Austrian noblewoman and ruling vassal
- Bertha Allen (1934–2010), Vuntut Gwitchin women's and aboriginal rights advocate
- Bertha Bacon (1866–1922), British suffragette
- Bertha Hirsch Baruch, German-American writer, social worker, and suffragist
- Bertha Becker (1930–2013), Brazilian geographer, author and professor
- Bertha Benz (1849–1944), wife of automobile inventor Karl Benz and the first person in history to drive an automobile over long distance
- Bertha Berry (1876–1954), American nurse
- Bertha Boronda (1877–1950), American criminal
- Bertha Southey Brammall (1878–1957), Australian writer
- Bertha Brainard (1890–1946), pioneering television executive
- Bertha Brouwer (1930–2006), Dutch sprinter
- Bertha Calloway (1925–2017), American activist and historian
- Bertha Felix Campigli (1882–1949), American/Coast Miwok photographer
- Bertha Colton (died 1959), American politician
- Bertha Coolidge (1880–1953), American painter
- Bertha Coombs (born 1961), reporter
- Bertha Crouch Chase (1874–1957), American athlete
- Bertha Crowther (1921–2007), British athlete
- Bertha Damon (1881–1975), American humorist, author, lecturer, and editor
- Bertha Díaz (1936–2019), Cuban track and field athlete
- Bertha Dorph (1875–1960), Danish painter
- Bertha Edwards (1920–2009), American librarian
- Bertha Bowness Fischer (1875–1920), British political agent
- Bertha Fowler (1866–1952), American educator, preacher, deaconess
- Bertha Gardiner (1845–1925), English historian
- Bertha Gifford (1871–1951), American serial killer
- Bertha Lund Glaeser (1862–1939), American physician
- Bertha Gxowa (1934–2010), South African anti-apartheid activist, trade unionist, and women's rights activist
- Bertha Harris (1937–2005), American novelist and activist
- Bertha George Harris (1913–2014), American Catawba tribal elder and master potter
- Bertha Hart, American mathematician
- Bertha Heser (1891–1964), American politician
- Bertha Heyman (born c. 1851), American criminal
- Bertha "Chippie" Hill (1905–1950), American blues and vaudeville singer and dancer
- Bertha von Hillern (1853–1939), American athlete and painter
- Bertha Hope (born 1936), American pianist and educator
- Bertha Hosang Mah (1896–1959), Canadian student
- Bertha Idaho (born c. 1895), American blues singer
- Bertha Jaques (1863–1941), American etcher and photographer
- Bertha Kalich (1874–1939), Jewish actress
- Bertha Kawakami (1931–2017), American politician and educator
- Bertha Koessler-Ilg (1881–1965), German-Argentine nurse and folklorist
- Bertha Kreidmann (died May 16, 1871), Hebrew poet and letter writer
- Bertha Krupp (1886–1957), sole proprietor of the Krupp industrial empire from 1902 to 1943
- Bertha Knight Landes (1868–1943), first female mayor of a major American city (Seattle, Washington)
- Bertha Lewis (1887–1931), English opera singer and actress
- Bertha Lutz (1894–1976), Brazilian zoologist, politician, and diplomat
- Bertha Mahony (1882–1969), publisher of children's literature
- Bertha Mann (1893–1967), American actress
- Bertha Mason (1855–1939), English suffragist and temperance campaigner
- Bertha Müller (1848–1937), Austrian painter
- Bertha Moraes Nérici (1921–2005), Brazilian World War II nurse
- Bertha Nghifikwa (born 1987), Namibian politician
- Bertha Nordenson (1857–1928), Swedish activist and suffragist
- Bertha Oliva (born c. 1956), Honduran human rights campaigner
- Bertha Parker Pallan (1907–1978), American archaeologist
- Bertha Palmer (1849–1918), American businesswoman, socialite, and philanthropist
- Bertha Pappenheim (1859–1936), Austrian-Jewish feminist and social pioneer
- Bertha Lee Pate (1903–1975), American blues vocalist
- Bertha Quinn (1873–1951), British suffragette and socialist, recipient of Papal Medal
- Bertha Rawlinson (1910–1994), New Zealand singer, actress, producer, composer and teacher
- Bertha Reynolds (1885–1978), American social worker
- Bertha E. Reynolds (1868–1961), American physician
- Bertha Ronge (1818–1863), Anglo-German kindergarten activist
- Bertha Runkle (1879–1958), American novelist and playwright
- Bertha Ryland (1882–1977), English militant suffragette
- Bertha Sánchez (born 1978), Colombian long-distance runner
- Bertha Schaefer (1895–1971), American designer and gallery director
- Bertha Schrader (1845–1920), German painter, lithographer, and woodblock print-maker
- Bertha von Suttner (1843–1914), Austrian novelist and pacifist
- Bertha Swirles (1903–1999), English physicist and applied mathematician
- Bertha Tammelin, (1836–1915), Swedish musician, composer and singer
- Bertha Teague (1906–1991), Hall of Fame basketball coach
- Bertha Thalheimer (1883–1959), German activist and politician
- Bertha Thomas (1845–1918), English author
- Bertha Townsend (1869–1909), American tennis player
- Bertha L. Turner (1867–1938), American caterer, cookbook author, and community leader
- Bertha Vadnais (died 1973), American politician
- Bertha Valerius (1824–1895), Swedish photographer
- Bertha Valkenburg (1862–1929), Dutch artist
- Bertha Vyver (1854–1941), caretaker for Scottish poet Charles Mackay and the companion of Marie Corelli
- Bertha Wegmann (1847–1926), Danish painter
- Bertha Wehnert-Beckmann (1815–1901), German photographer
- Bertha Wellin (1870–1951), Swedish politician and nurse
- Bertha Whedbee (1876–1960), American activist, suffragist, and police officer
- Bertha Yerex Whitman (1892–1984), American architect
- Bertha Wiernik (1884–1951), Jewish American writer
- Bertha Willmott (1894–1973), British actress, comedienne, singer and performer
- Bertha Wilson (1923–2007), first female Puisne Justice of the Supreme Court of Canada
- Bertha M. Wilson (1874–1936), American dramatist, critic, actress
- Bertha Wright (1876–1971), American nurse
- Bertha Zillessen (1872–1936), German painter and photographer
- Bertha Zück (1797–1868), German-Swedish royal treasurer
- Bertha Züricher (1869–1949), Swiss author, painter and engraver

== Fictional characters ==
- Bertha Cool, main character in the fictional of a series of novels titled Cool and Lam
- Bertha Marilla, main character of the eighth book in the Anne of Green Gables series, Rilla of Ingleside
- Bertha Mason, character in Charlotte Brontë's 1847 novel Jane Eyre
- Big Bertha, superhero appearing in comic books published by Marvel Comics

== See also ==
- Bertha (disambiguation)
- Big Bertha (disambiguation)
- Bertrade (disambiguation)
