= Bertha (disambiguation) =

Bertha is a female given name.

It can also refer to:

== Places ==
In the United States

- Bertha, Minnesota, a city
- Bertha, Missouri, an unincorporated community
- Bertha, Nebraska, an unincorporated community
- Bertha, Virginia, an unincorporated community
- Bertha, West Virginia, an unincorporated community
- Bertha Township, Todd County, Minnesota

Elsewhere

- Bertha (Perth), former Roman fortress in Scotland
- Bertha Park, community within Perth, Scotland
- Bertha Island, Mac. Robertson Land, Antarctica
- 154 Bertha, an asteroid
- Bertha Memorial Garden, Hong Kong

== Entertainment ==
- Bertha (TV series), stop-motion animated BBC children's series of 13 parts from the crew from Postman Pat
- Bertha (opera), an opera by Ned Rorem
- "Bertha" (song), by the Grateful Dead
- Bertha (Pokémon), a character in the Pokémon universe
- Bertha Antonietta Mason, a minor supporting character in Charlotte Brontë's classic novel Jane Eyre, where she is depicted as the mentally ill wife of Mr. Edward Rochester

== Other uses ==
- Hurricane Bertha (disambiguation), multiple hurricanes
- a Victorian type of ladies' collar (clothing)
- Bertha or Berta language, spoken in Sudan and Ethiopia
- Bertha (tunnel boring machine), a machine made by Hitachi Zosen Corporation for the Alaskan Way Viaduct replacement tunnel project in Seattle
- Bertha (drag boat), steam-powered boat built in 1844 to remove silt from the Port of Bridgwater
- Bertha family, Hungarian noble family from Vas county
- SS Bertha, several ships

== See also ==
- Big Bertha (disambiguation)
- Berta (disambiguation)
- Birtha (disambiguation)
