= Vardiskhevi =

Vardiskhevi (Georgian: ვარდისხევი) was a populated place in the historical region of Klarjeti, in what is now Artvin Province's central district. Today, it lies within the boundaries of the village of Ağıllar (Agara) in Artvin District.

== History ==
Vardiskhevi (ვარდისხევი) is composed of the Georgian words vardi (ვარდი), meaning "rose", and khevi (ხევი), meaning "valley" or "ravine", and means "rose valley" or "rose ravine". It appears as "Vartashev" (Vartashev) on a 1913 map by Kiepert. The place name entered Turkish as "Vartishev" (وارطیسخو) and Vartishev (وارطسخو).

Vardiskhevi was recorded in the 1835 population register as "Vartishev" (وارطیسخو). At the time, it was one of the villages of the Livane-i Ulya sanjak of the Çıldır Eyalet. For military conscription and taxation purposes, the Ottoman administration recorded only the male population of the village. There were 171 men in 80 households. When an equal number of women is added, the total population of Vardiskhevi was approximately 342 people.

In the second half of the 19th century, Vardiskhevi was part of the Livana district of the Lazistan sanjak, one of the four sanjaks of the Trabzon Vilayet. In the 1876 Trabzon Vilayet Salname, Vardsihevi was recorded together with the village of Gurcani as "Gurcan-Vartishev" (كورجان – وارطسخو). According to the salname, the two settlements had a population of 307 people in 88 households. The salname also recorded 80 oxen, 85 cows, 10 horses, 552 goats and 500 sheep as taxable livestock in the two settlements.

Following the Russo-Turkish War of 1877–1878, Vardiskhevi was ceded by the Ottoman Empire to Russia under the Treaty of Berlin. Vardiskhevi is not recorded as a separate village in the 1886 Russian census. The nearby settlement of Vaziskhevi, however, was recorded in the census. However, a Russian-language agricultural book published in 1908 records the village of Vardiskhevi under the Georgian form "Vardishevi" (Вардисхеви), together with the villages of Orcohi, Tsria, İşhalbir, Tolgom, Svetibari and Lomaşeni, as one of the main centers of olive cultivation in the Artvin area.

Vardiskhevi is shown on a 1913 map by the German geographer Richard Kiepert immediately northwest of the village of Boselta. In the same area, Vaziskhevi ("Vazischev"), whose name is similar to that of Vardiskhevi, is shown west of Vardiskhevi, immediately north of the village of Gurcani. In a 2015 field survey, Vardiskhevi was recorded as a locality within the village of Ağıllar (Agara) under the name "Vartishevi" (ვართისხევი).
