= Vaziskhevi =

Vaziskhevi (Georgian: ვაზისხევი) was a settlement in the historical region of Klarjeti, in what is now the central district of Artvin Province. It has since become a locality within the Derinköy village of the central district of Artvin Province.

== History ==
The Georgian place name Vaziskhevi (ვაზისხევი) is composed of the words vazi (ვაზი), meaning "grapevine", and khevi (ხევი), meaning "ravine" or "valley". The name therefore roughly means "Grapevine Valley". The name suggests that viticulture was practiced in the area. Vaziskhevi is also registered in some sources as "Vazihev". The 1913 map of the German geographer Richard Kiepert, for example, gives the name as "Vasichev".

In the Russian administration's 1886 population census, Vaziskhevi was registered as Vazikhev (Вазихевъ). The settlement was located in the Artvin district (uchastok) of the Artvin okrug and was a neighborhood of the village of Gurjani in the Gurjani subdistrict (nahiye). It consisted of seven households. Gurjani itself had 164 inhabitants in 19 households. Based on the average number of inhabitants per household in Gurjani, the population of Vaziskhevi can be estimated at approximately 60 people. The inhabitants of both Gurjani and Vaziskhevi, historically Georgian settlements, were registered as "Turks" in the census.

Vaziskhevi was shown on Kiepert's map as "Vazikhev", immediately north of the village of Gurjani (Derinköy). In the same area, Vardiskhevi ("Vartaschev"), whose name is sometimes confused with that of Vaziskhevi, was located east of Vaziskhevi, near and northwest of the village of Boselta (Okumuşlar).

Vaziskhevi did not appear as a separate village in later registers. In Artvin Yer Adları Sözlüğü (Dictionary of Artvin Place Names), Taner Artvinli records the name, based on a land registry entry, as a locality ("Vazihav") within Derinköy. The name Vaziskhevi was also documented in a 2015 research survey. A stream in the area is currently known as the "Vazihev Deresi".
