= Nerici =

Nerici or Nerići may refer to:

- Nerići, village in the Republika Srpska, Bosnia and Herzegovina
- Bartolomeo Nerici (c. 1708–c. 1798), Italian engraver and printmaker
- Bertha Moraes Nérici (1921–2005), Brazilian nurse
