= Berta =

Berta is a female Germanic name or may also be a colloquial shortening of Alberta, Gilberta or Roberta.

Berta may refer to:

== People ==
=== Given name ===
- Berta Berkovich Kohút (1921–2021), survivor of the Auschwitz concentration camp
- Berta Bock (1857–1945), Romanian composer
- Berta Bojetu (1946–1997), Slovene writer, poet and actress
- Berta Cáceres (1971–2016), Honduran (Lenca) environmental activist, indigenous leader
- Berta Castañé (born 2002), Catalan Spanish actress and model
- Berta Daniel (1896–1981), German photographer and political activist
- Berta Drews (1901–1987), German stage and film actress
- Berta García Grau (born 2005), Spanish para swimmer
- Berta Loran (1926–2025), Polish-born Brazilian actress
- Berta Persson (1893–1961), first woman bus driver in Sweden
- Berta Piñán (born 1963), Spanish (Asturian) writer, politician
- Berta Sieradzki (1911–2019), German-born Jewish Canadian centenarian
- Berta Singerman (1901–1998), Belarusian-Argentine singer and actress
- Berta Türk (1888–1960), Austrian-born Hungarian actress
- Berta Vázquez (born 1992), Ukrainian-born Spanish actress, model, and singer
- Berta Zuckerkandl (1864–1945), Austrian writer, journalist, and art critic

=== Surname ===
- Annalisa Berta, American paleontologist and professor emerita
- Elena Berta (born 1992), Italian sailor
- Renato Berta, Swiss cinematographer and film director

== Other ==
- Berta people, an ethnic group from western Ethiopia and eastern Sudan
  - Berta language, their language
- Berta (moth), a geometer moth genus
- Berta monastery, a medieval Georgian monastery in modern Turkey
- Berta, a fictional character on the American sitcom Two and a Half Men, portrayed by Conchata Ferrell
- Berta, a former name of Ortaköy, Artvin, Turkey

== See also ==
- Bertha (disambiguation)
- Alberta (disambiguation)
- Roberta (given name)
