= Çolak =

Çolak is a Turkish surname. Notable people with the surname include:

- Adnan Çolak (born 1952), Turkish serial killer
- Elif Ceren Çolak (born 2005), Turkish trampoline gymnast
- Emre Çolak, Turkish footballer
- Halil Çolak, Turkish-Dutch footballer
- Selahattin Çolak, Turkish politician
- Sülmez Çolak (born 1975), German politician
- Tanju Çolak, Turkish footballer
