= Avcıkoru, Şile =

Neighborhood in Şile district of Istanbul, Turkey

Coordinates: 41°07′13″N 29°24′50″E

Avcıkoru is a neighborhood in the Şile district of Istanbul province, Turkey.

== Demographics ==
Its population is 130 (2019).

== Location ==
It is bordered on the north by the Şile neighborhoods Karakiraz, Sahilköy, and Doğancılı, on the northeast by the Şile neighborhood Alacalı, on the southeast by the Şile neighborhood Üvezli, on the south by the Şile neighborhood Kömürlük, and on the southwest by the district of Çekmeköy.

== Name ==
Avcıkoru means literally "hunter reserve" or "hunter grove" (Turkish: avcı + koru). The name sometimes appears as Avcıkorusu.

== History ==
In the 19th century, much of the land around Avcıkoru belonged to the Bezmialem Valide Sultan Foundation.

In 1879, imperial authorities proposed settling refugees from the Circassian genocide in the area, despite objections from some local residents. In 1880, refugees from Berta in the Livane district of Batum (modern Ortaköy, Artvin) also applied to settle in the area. Limited settlement of refugees with some imperial assistance took place starting in 1881. However, assistance was not effective or sufficient, with deaths from starvation reported in 1887.
