= Bağcılar (disambiguation) =

Bağcılar is a district on the European side of Istanbul.

Bağcılar may also refer to:

- Bağcılar, Artvin, a village in Artvin Province, Turkey
- Bağcılar, Dinar, a village in Afyonkarahisar Province, Turkey
- Bağcılar, Koçarlı, a village in Aydın Province, Turkey
- Bağcılar, Kulp, a village in Diyarbakır Province, Turkey
