= Confidence Queen =

Confidence Queen may refer to:

- Bertha Heyman, 19th-century American criminal, also known as "Big Bertha" or the "Confidence Queen"
- Confidence Queen (TV series), 2025 South Korean TV series
