= Portsmouth Community Library =

Historic library in Virginia, US

- U.S. National Register of Historic Places
- Virginia Landmarks Register
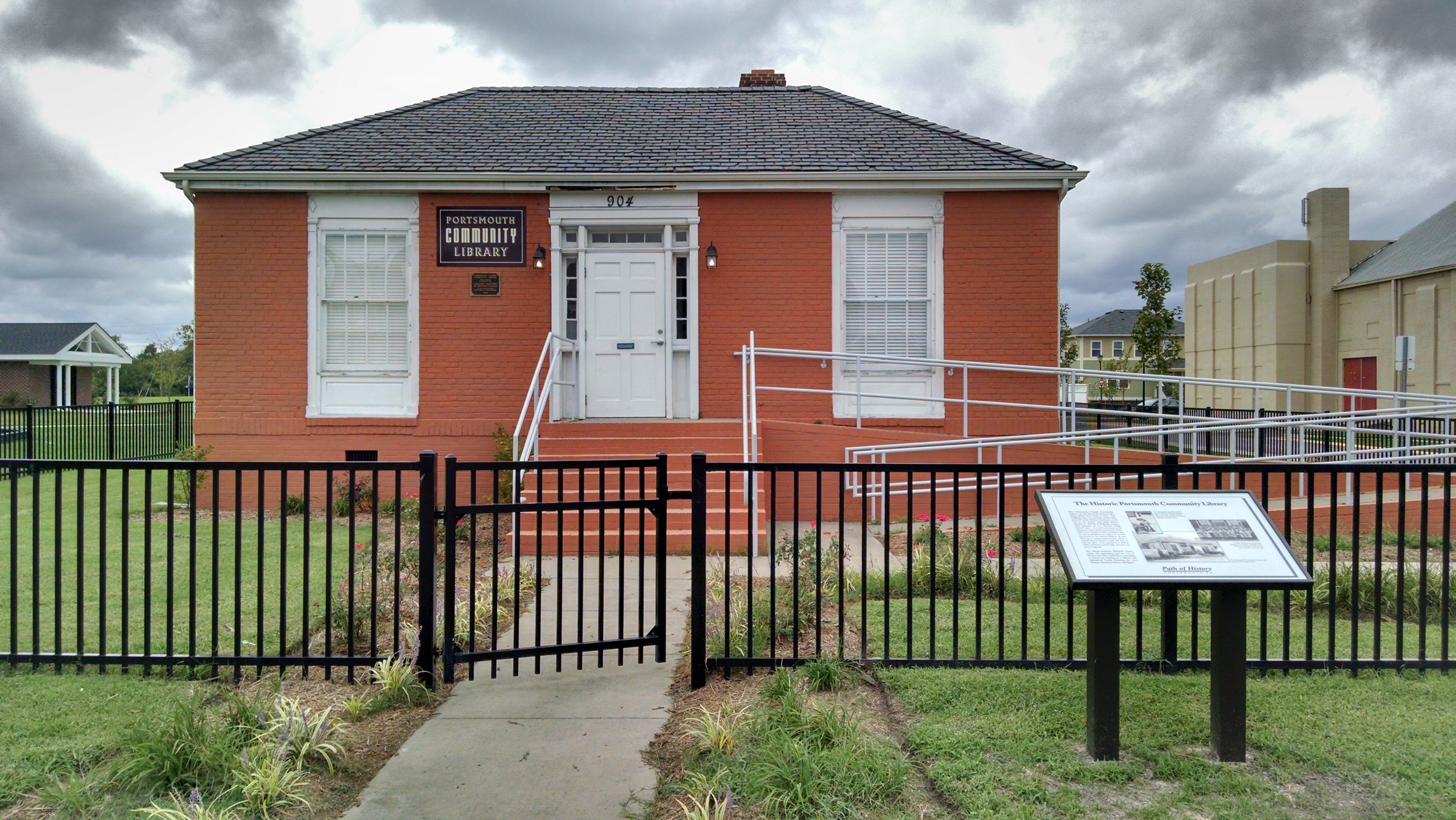

- Location within Virginia Location within the United States
- Location: 906 Elm St., Portsmouth, Virginia
- Coordinates: 36°49′54″N 76°18′46″W
- Area: 3 acres (1.2 ha)
- Built: less than one acre
- NRHP reference No.: 10000544
- VLR No.: 124-5130

Significant dates
- Added to NRHP: August 12, 2010
- Designated VLR: December 17, 2009

Portsmouth Community Library, also known as the Portsmouth Colored Community Library, is a historic library building located at Portsmouth, Virginia. It was built in 1945 at 804 South Street. It is a one-story, three-bay, brick building with a hipped roof. It was built to provide for the reading needs of Portsmouth's African Americans. Bertha Edwards was the first librarian, and was a key to its success as she raised funds for the library.

In 1959, two local dentists, Dr. James Holley and Dr. Hugo A. Owens, successfully sued the City of Portsmouth and the Portsmouth Public Library to integrate the public library, which resulted in the closure of the Portsmouth Community Library. The building has been relocated twice since it was closed in 1962 after integration of the public library system; first in 1967 to the parking lot of Ebenezer Baptist Church, 730 Effingham Street, then since August 2007, it has been located at the present location, 904 Elm Avenue. It was listed on the National Register of Historic Places in 2010.

The library is now operated as a museum of local African-American history by the City of Portsmouth. Displays include photographs and memorabilia, as well as African-American books and journals from the former library.

The African American Historical Society of Portsmouth led efforts to dedicate the historic library as a museum, which opened in 2013.
