= Birtha =

Birtha (Greek: Βίρθα) may refer to the following:

== Places ==
- Birtha (Mesopotamia), on the Tigris, now at Tikrit, Iraq
- early Ancient name of the later Palmyran city Zenobia, now Halabiye, in Syria
- Birecik, modern name of Birtha on the Euphrates, Turkey
- Birtha (Thapsacus), near Thapsacus, location not precisely known

== Other ==
- Birtha (moth), a moth genus
- Birtha (band), an all-female hard rock band featuring Rosemary Butler
