= Şehitlik =

Şehitlik can refer to:

- Şehitlik, Pazaryolu
- Şehitlik Mosque
- Şehitlik, Artvin
- Şehitlik railway station
