= Adnan Çolak =

Turkish serial killer and rapist (born 1952)

- Born: Adnan Çolak; 5 September 1952 (age 74); Turkey]
- Other name: "Baltalı Katil" ("The Axe Murderer") or "Artvin Canavarı" ("The Beast of Artvin")
- Penalty: Six death sentences and 40 years imprisonment; commuted to life imprisonment

Details
- Victims: 11 elderly men and women
- Span of crimes: 1992–1995
- Country: Turkey
- State: Artvin
- Date apprehended: 1995; 31 years ago

Adnan Çolak (born 5 September 1952) is a Turkish serial killer and rapist known as "Baltalı Katil" ("The Axe Murderer") or "Artvin Canavarı" ("The Beast of Artvin").

He murdered eleven elderly people, including six women, whom he raped. He was sentenced to death and 40 years in prison. His death penalty was commuted to life imprisonment. In 2005, he was released from prison on conditional release arrangement.

== Crimes ==
The first crime was committed when an elderly couple from the Seyitler village of Artvin was killed with an axe around 23 hours local time on 6 October 1992. The man raped the 15-year-old girl of the family twice in the barn, and then took her to a cave a few kilometres away from the crime scene, and raped her there as well.

In the morning hours, one year later, an elderly man and his bride from the Soğanlı village were found killed by adze in the head. The woman was raped. The two crime scenes were a few kilometers away from each other. Four months later, a 62-year-old woman living alone in the Salkımlı village was attacked on the way to her barn in the night. She tried to defend herself with a sickle-shaped knife, however, the man took the knife from her, and hit her in the head with the knife. He raped her, and left her, thinking she was dead. The old woman survived despite the severe wound on her head. The people of Artvin were furious at the security forces who were unable to solve the incidents. Exactly four months later, an elderly couple from the Gümüşhane village were found killed, and their bodies burnt almost beyond identification in the house fire. The killer was determined not to leave any clues. Four months later, an elderly couple and then an elderly woman were murdered. Again there were no eyewitnesses, no tools of crime, no fingerprints, and no trace of the killer. But in the examination of the woman's body, a clue was found for the first time: tissue residues under the victim's fingernails and in her vagina. The DNA analysis of the tissue residues, done at the Forensic Medicine Institute's Biology Laboratory, proved negative. The tissue residue, the hair samples belonged to the victim. The killer had once again succeeded in leaving no trace behind.

The killer's last victim was a 58-year-old woman from the Salkımlı village. She was knocked unconscious, strangled with a headscarf, and raped. The man left the house, thinking she was dead. But she was alive, she asked her neighbors for help with her last effort before she fainted. She was taken to the hospital. The woman identified the perpetrator as her neighbor Adnan Çolak, and described the crime in great detail.

== Aftermath ==
Adnan Çolak was arrested by the security force the same day in 1995 following the woman's statement. Living in the Salkımlı village of Artvin, northeastern Turkey, he is father of three children.

The trial began in the Supreme Court of Zonguldak, northwestern Turkey. Çolak calmly described the murders he committed. He killed eleven elderly people between the ages of 68 and 95 in the rural area of Artvin from 1992 to 1995. Six of his victims were women whom he raped before murdering them. He was dubbed "Artvin Canavarı" ("The Beast of Artvin") or "Baltalı Katil" ("The Axe Murder") as he committed his murders with an axe.

In his statement in court, he explained that he committed the crimes because he wanted to prevent elderly people consume sustenance of the youngs.

The trial lasted for more than five years. Finally, he was found guilty, and was given six death sentences and 40 years in prison. His sentence was commuted to life imprisonment when Turkey abolished the death penalty in 2004. On 28 May 2005, he was released from prison under a conditional release arrangement known as the "Rahşan Pardon", the Conditional Release and Postponement Act (21 December 2000).

== See also ==
- List of serial killers by country
- List of serial killers by number of victims
