= Alabalık =

Alabalık can refer to:

- Alabalık, Artvin
- Alabalık, Narman
- Alabalık, Posof
