= Vadnais =

Vadnais may refer to:

- Bertha Vadnais (died 1973), American politician
- Carol Vadnais (1945–2014), Canadian ice hockey player
- Vadnais Lake, a lake in Minnesota
- Vadnais Heights, Minnesota, city in the United States
