= Tütüncüler =

Tütüncüler may refer to the following places in Turkey:

- Tütüncüler, Artvin
- Tütüncüler, Bozdoğan
