= Sarıbudak, Artvin =

Sarıbudak
- Village
- Location within Turkey
- Coordinates: 41.076667°N 41.765°E
- Country: Turkey
- Province: Artvin
- District: Artvin
- Population (2021): 105
- Time zone: UTC+3 (TRT)

Sarıbudak is a village in the Artvin District of Artvin Province, Turkey. Its population is 105 (2021).
