= Sümbüllü =

- Village
- Location within Turkey
- Coordinates: 41°13′48″N 41°48′29″E
- Country: Turkey
- Province: Artvin
- District: Artvin
- Population (2021): 170
- Time zone: UTC+3 (TRT)

Sümbüllü is a village in the Artvin District of Artvin Province, Turkey. Its population is 170 (2021).
