= Pırnallı, Artvin =

Pırnallı
- Village
- Location within Turkey
- Coordinates: 41°15′N 42°04′E
- Country: Turkey
- Province: Artvin
- District: Artvin
- Population (2021): 137
- Time zone: UTC+3 (TRT)

Pırnallı is a village in the Artvin District of Artvin Province, Turkey. Its population is 137 (2021).
