= Yanıklı, Artvin =

Yanıklı
- Village
- Location within Turkey
- Coordinates: 41.306667°N 42.120556°E
- Country: Turkey
- Province: Artvin
- District: Artvin
- Population (2021): 325
- Time zone: UTC+3 (TRT)

Yanıklı is a village in the Artvin District of Artvin Province, Turkey. Its population is 325 (2021).
