= Dokuzoğul, Artvin =

Dokuzoğul
- Village
- Location within Turkey
- Coordinates: 41°03′N 41°46′E
- Country: Turkey
- Province: Artvin
- District: Artvin
- Population (2021): 98
- Time zone: UTC+3 (TRT)

Dokuzoğul is a village in the Artvin District of Artvin Province, Turkey. Its population is 98 (2021).
