= Ahlat, Artvin =

Ahlat
- Village
- Location within Turkey
- Coordinates: 41.2108°N 41.8772°E
- Country: Turkey
- Province: Artvin
- District: Artvin
- Population (2021): 116
- Time zone: UTC+3 (TRT)

Ahlat (Georgian: აგლახა, romanized: aglakha) is a village in the Artvin District, Artvin Province, Turkey. Its population is 116 (2021).
