= Samuel Rawson Gardiner =

English historian (1829–1902)

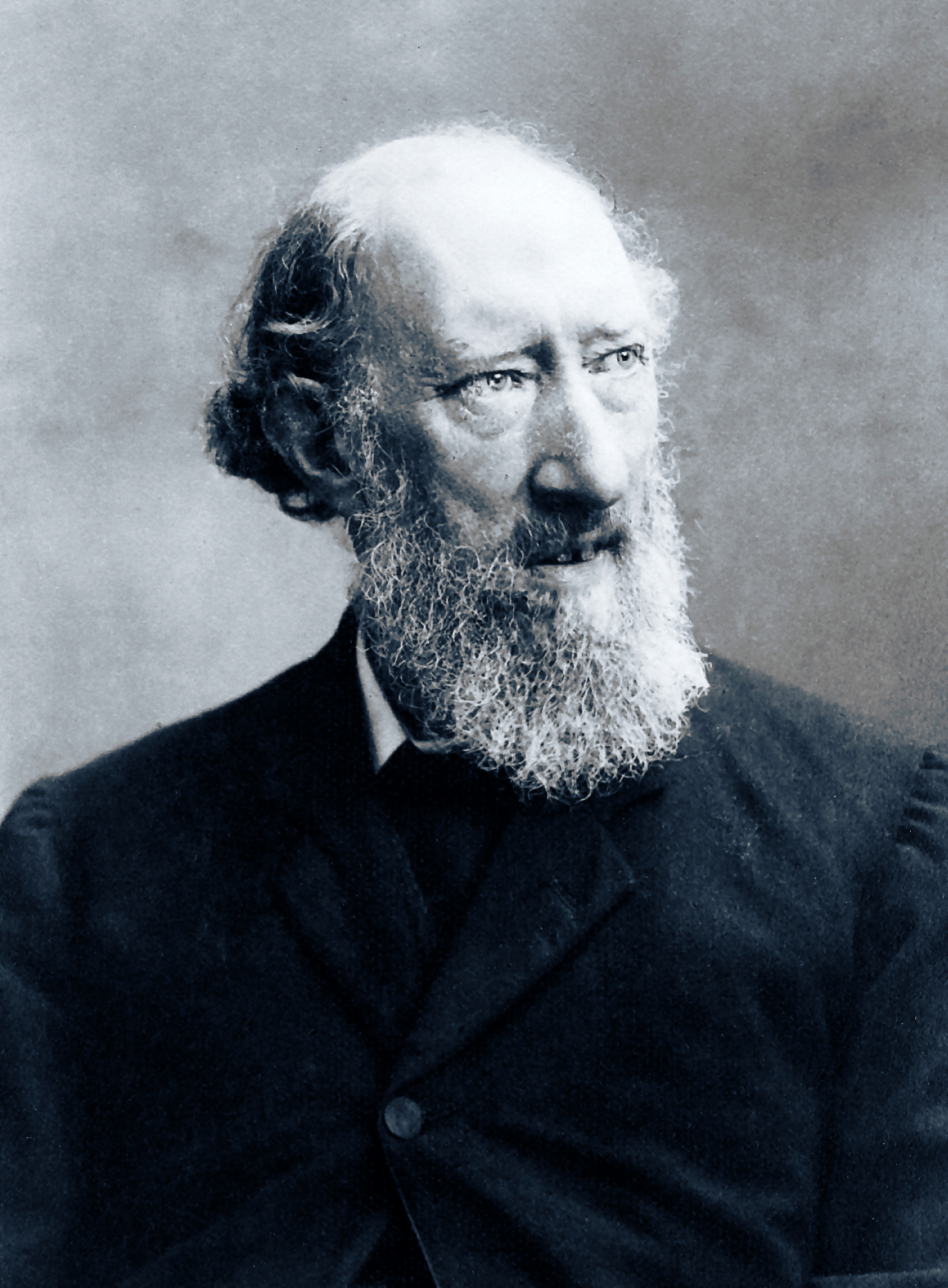
Samuel Rawson Gardiner, National Portrait Gallery

Samuel Rawson Gardiner (4 March 1829 – 24 February 1902) was an English historian who specialized in 17th-century English history as a prominent foundational historian of the early Stuart Monarchy, the Puritan revolution and the English Civil War, and the subsequent Commonwealth and Protectorate.

== Life ==
The son of Rawson Boddam Gardiner, he was born in Ropley, Hampshire. He was educated at Winchester College and Christ Church, Oxford, where he obtained a first class in Literae Humaniores. He was subsequently elected to fellowships at All Souls (1884) and Merton (1892). For some years he was professor of modern history at King's College London, and devoted his life to the subject. In 1896 he was elected to give the first series of Ford Lectures at Oxford University. He died in Sevenoaks, aged 72.

== Puritan Revolution ==
Gardiner published his history of the Puritan Revolution and English Civil War in three series of 19 volumes, originally published under different titles, beginning with the accession of King James I of England. Following Gardiner's death, it was completed in two volumes by Charles Harding Firth as The Last Years of the Protectorate (1909).

The series is History of England from the Accession of James I to the Outbreak of the Civil War, 1603–1642 (10 vols. 1883–4); History of the Great Civil War, 1642–1649 (5 vols. 1893); and History of the Commonwealth and Protectorate, 1649–1660 (4 vol. 1903). Gardiner's treatment of the subject is exhaustive and philosophical, taking in political and constitutional history, the changes in religion, thought and sentiment, their causes and their tendencies. Of his original sources, many exist only in manuscript, and his researches in public and private collections of manuscripts at home, and in the archives of Simancas, Venice, Rome, Brussels and Paris, were tireless and productive.

Gardiner may have been drawn to the period by the fact that he was descended from Oliver Cromwell and Henry Ireton, but it is said that his judgments were unbiased, and his appreciations of character reveal fine perception and broad sympathies, as shown in his analyses of the characters of James I, Francis Bacon, William Laud, and Thomas Wentworth, as well as Oliver Cromwell.

On constitutional matters, Gardiner is considered to write with an insight achieved by the study of political philosophy, discussing in a masterly fashion the dreams of idealists and the schemes of government proposed by statesmen. Throughout his work he gives a prominent place to everything which illustrates human progress in moral and religious, as well as political conceptions, and specially to the rise and development of the idea of religious toleration, finding much of his source material in the writings of obscure pamphleteers, whose essays indicate currents of public opinion. His record of the relations between England and other states proves his thorough knowledge of contemporary European history, and is rendered specially valuable by his researches among manuscript sources which have enabled him to expound for the first time some intricate pieces of diplomacy.

Gardiner's work is long and minute. He is apt to attach an exaggerated importance to some of the authorities which he was the first to bring to light, to see a general tendency in what may only be the expression of an individual eccentricity, to rely too much on ambassadors' reports which may have been written for some special end, to enter too fully into the details of diplomatic correspondence. His style is clear and unadorned, with more than a hint of Tacitus; he appeals to the intellect rather than to the emotions, and is seldom picturesque, though in describing a few famous scenes, such as the execution of Charles I, he writes with pathos and dignity.

By some estimations, the minuteness of his narrative detracts from its interest; though his arrangement is generally good, here and there the reader finds the thread of a subject broken by the intrusion of incidents not immediately connected with it, and does not pick it up again without an effort. And Gardiner has the defects of his supreme qualities, of his fairness and critical ability as a judge of character; his work lacks enthusiasm, and leaves the reader cold and unmoved. Yet, apart from its sterling excellence, it is not without beauties, for it is marked by loftiness of thought, a love of purity and truth, and refinement in taste and feeling.

Gardiner wrote other books, mostly on the same period, but his great history is that by which he is widely known, and considered a worthy result of a life of unremitting labor, and a noted example of historical scholarship. His position as a historian was formally acknowledged. In 1882 he was given a civil list pension of £150 per annum, "in recognition of his valuable contributions to the history of England"; he was honorary D.C.L. of Oxford, LL.D. of Edinburgh, and Ph.D. of Göttingen, and honorary Student of Christ Church, Oxford; and in 1894 he declined the appointment of Regius Professor of Modern History at Oxford, lest its duties should interfere with the accomplishment of his history.

Historian John Morrill said:

Gardiner was a brilliant historian, who tested the veracity, accuracy, and biases of every source and picked his way through the evidence with a care and clarity of exposition which brooks no equal for this or any other period.

A standard modern study of Gardiner is Mark Nixon, Samuel Rawson Gardiner and the Idea of History (Royal Historical Society/Boydell Press, 2010).

== Evaluation of Oliver Cromwell ==
As a foremost historian of the era, Gardiner's evaluation of Oliver Cromwell is especially significant. No figure in English history has called forth a greater range of evaluations.

On the positive side Gardiner concluded:

"The man—it is ever so with the noblest—was greater than his work. In his own heart lay the resolution to subordinate self to public ends, and to subordinate material to moral and spiritual objects of desire. He was limited by the defects which make imperfect the character and intellect even of the noblest and the wisest of mankind. He was limited still more by the unwillingness of his contemporaries to mould themselves after his ideas. The blows that he had struck against the older system had their enduring effects. Few wished for the revival of the absolute kingship, of the absolute authority of a single House of Parliament, or of the Laudian system of governing the Church....The living forces of England—forces making for the destruction of those barriers which he was himself breaking through, buoyed him up—as a strong and self-confident swimmer, he was carried onward by the flowing tide."

"In the latter portion of the Protector's career it was far otherwise. His failure to establish a permanent Government was not due merely to his deficiency in constructive imagination. It was due rather to two causes: the umbrage taken at his position as head of an army whose interference in political affairs gave even more offence than the financial burdens it imposed on a people unaccustomed to regular taxation; and the reaction which set in against the spiritual claims of that Puritanism of which he had become the mouthpiece…. It was no reaction against the religious doctrines or ecclesiastical institutions upheld by the Protector that brought about the destruction of his system of government.... So far as the reaction was not directed against militarism, it was directed against the introduction into the political world of what appeared to be too high a standard of morality, a reaction which struck specially upon Puritanism, but which would have struck with as much force upon any other form of religion which, like that upheld by Laud, called in the power of the State to enforce its claims. Even though Oliver was in his own person no sour fanatic, as Royalist pamphleteers after the Restoration falsely asserted; it is impossible to deny that he strove by acts of government to lead men into the paths of morality and religion beyond the limit which average human nature had fixed for itself."

"In dealing with foreign nations his mistake on this head was more conspicuous, because he had far less knowledge of the conditions of efficient action abroad than he had at home. It may fairly be said that he knew less of Scotland than of England, less of Ireland than of Great Britain, and less of the Continent than of any one of the three nations over which he ruled. It has sometimes been said that Oliver made England respected in Europe. It would be more in accordance with truth to say that he made her feared."

"Oliver's claim to greatness can be tested by the undoubted fact that his character receives higher and wider appreciation as the centuries pass by. The limitations on his nature—the one-sidedness of his religious zeal, the mistakes of his policy—are thrust out of sight, the nobility of his motives, the strength of his character, and the breadth of his intellect, force themselves on the minds of generations for which the objects for which he strove have been for the most part attained, though often in a different fashion from that which he placed before himself. Even those who refuse to waste a thought on his spiritual aims remember with gratitude his constancy of effort to make England great by land and sea; and it would be well for them also to be reminded of his no less constant efforts to make England worthy of greatness."

== Family ==
Gardiner married twice. First to Isabell Irving, daughter of Rev Edward Irving. After her death in 1878, he married fellow historian Bertha Cordey in 1883. His great-granddaughter, Mary Boyce, was a British scholar of Iranian languages and an authority on Zoroastrianism.

== Works ==
- History of England from the Accession of James I to the Disgrace of Chief-justice Coke. 1602–1616 (London: Hurst and Blackett, 1863) read online
- Prince Charles and the Spanish Marriage, 1617–1623 (2 vols.) (London: Hurst and Blackett, 1869) read online
- The Thirty Years' War, 1618–1648 (London: Longmans, Green and Company, 1874) read online
- History of England from the Accession of James I to the Outbreak of the Civil War, 1603–1642 (10 vols.) (London: Longmans, Green and Company) (1883–1884, 1896–1901, 1904–1908) read online
- History of the Great Civil War, 1642–1649 (3 vols.) (London: Longmans, Green and Company, 1886–1891; 4 vols., 1893–4, 1904–1905) read online
- The Constitutional Documents of the Puritan Revolution, 1628–1660 (Oxford: Clarendon Press, 1889, 1906, 1951) read online
- A Student's History of England, from the Earliest Times to 1885 (2 vols.) (London: Longmans, Green and Company, 1890–1891, 1895–1897). read online
- The Hanoverian Period (London: T. Nelson and Sons, 1891) read online
- Outline of English History B.C. 55 – A.D. 1886 (London: Longmans, Green and Company, 1891) read online
- A School Atlas of English History (ed.) (London: Longmans, Green and Company, 1892) read online
- History of the Commonwealth and Protectorate, 1649–1660 (4 vols.) (London: Longman, Green and Company, 1897–1901, 1894–1903). read online
- What Gunpowder Plot Was (London, Longmans, Green and Company, 1897) read online
- Letters and papers relating to the First Dutch War, 1652–1654 Publications of the Navy Records Society. 6 vols. (London: Navy Records Society, 1898–1930). [Vols 1–2 edited by Samuel Rawson Gardiner. Volume 3 edited by Samuel Rawson Gardiner and C. T. Atkinson; vols 4–6 by C. T. Atkinson.]
- Oliver Cromwell (London, Goupil and Company, 1899, 1901, 1903) read online
- Prince Rupert at Lisbon (ed.) (London: Royal Historical Society, 1902) read online
- Outline of English History B.C. 55 – A.D. 1902 (London: Longmans, Green and Company, 1903, 1905) read online

He edited collections of papers for the Camden Society, and in 1891- was editor of the English Historical Review.
