= Sakalar, Artvin =

Sakalar
- Village
- Location within Turkey
- Coordinates: 41.203333°N 41.998611°E
- Country: Turkey
- Province: Artvin
- District: Artvin
- Population (2021): 219
- Time zone: UTC+3 (TRT)

Sakalar is a village in the Artvin District of Artvin Province, Turkey. Its population is 219 (2021).
