= Hızarlı, Artvin =

Hızarlı
- Village
- Location within Turkey
- Coordinates: 41.048333°N 41.870278°E
- Country: Turkey
- Province: Artvin
- District: Artvin
- Population (2021): 109
- Time zone: UTC+3 (TRT)

Hızarlı is a village in the Artvin District, Artvin Province, Turkey. Its population is 109 (2021).

== Nearby towns ==
Dikmenli (3.9 km west) // Yukarımaden (7.6 km south west) // Zeytinlik (8.1 km north) // Oruçlu (7.5 km north west) // Okumuşlar (7.5 km north east) // Aşağımaden (8.2 km south west) // [all distances 'as the bird flies' and approximate].
