= Bertha Schrader =

German painter

- Born: 11 June 1845; Memel, Kingdom of Prussia
- Died: 11 May 1920 (aged 74); Dresden, Weimar Republic
- Known for: Painting

Bertha Schrader (11 June 1845 – 11 May 1920) was a German painter, lithographer, and woodblock print-maker.

== Biography ==
Schrader was born on 11 June 1845, in Memel, Lithuania. She studied with Carl Graeb's son Paul Graeb (1842-1892) in Berlin, and with Paul Baum (1854-1932) in Dresden. From 1882 to 1916, Schrader was a member of the Verein der Berliner Künstlerinnen (Association of Berlin Artists) where she exhibited her paintings. She was also a member of the Dresden Women Artists Association, serving as the chairwoman.

She exhibited her work at the Woman's Building at the 1893 World's Columbian Exposition in Chicago, Illinois.

Schrader died on 11 May 1920, in Dresden.

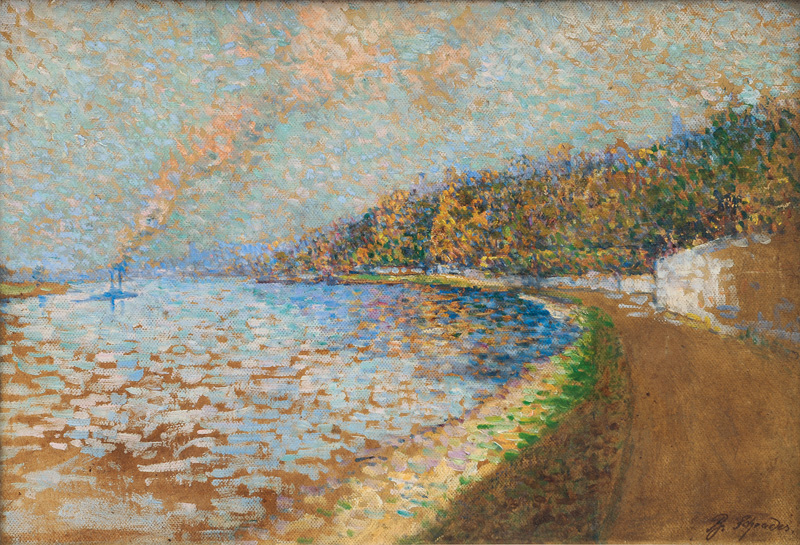
An der Elbe by Bertha Schrader
