= Varlık, Artvin =

Varlık
- Village
- Location within Turkey
- Coordinates: 41.221389°N 41.868611°E
- Country: Turkey
- Province: Artvin
- District: Artvin
- Population (2021): 210
- Time zone: UTC+3 (TRT)

Varlık is a village in the Artvin District of Artvin Province, Turkey. Its population is 210 (2021).
