= Bakırköy, Artvin =

Bakırköy
- Village
- Location within Turkey
- Coordinates: 41.2418°N 41.8077°E
- Country: Turkey
- Province: Artvin
- District: Artvin
- Population (2021): 110
- Time zone: UTC+3 (TRT)

Bakırköy is a village in the Artvin District, Artvin Province, Turkey. Its population is 110 (2021).
