= Ormanlı, Artvin =

Ormanlı
- Village
- Location within Turkey
- Coordinates: 41.258333°N 41.756944°E
- Country: Turkey
- Province: Artvin
- District: Artvin
- Population (2021): 265
- Time zone: UTC+3 (TRT)

Ormanlı is a village in the Artvin District of Artvin Province, Turkey. Its population is 265 (2021).
