= Taşlıca, Artvin =

Taşlıca
- Village
- Location within Turkey
- Coordinates: 41.174444°N 41.715556°E
- Country: Turkey
- Province: Artvin
- District: Artvin
- Population (2021): 176
- Time zone: UTC+3 (TRT)

Taşlıca is a village in the Artvin District of Artvin Province, Turkey. Its population is 176 (2021).
