= SS Bertha =

SS Bertha is the name of the following ships:

- SS Bertha (1888), a steamer in service 1888–1915 for Alaska Commercial Co., possibly the namesake for Mount Bertha
- SS Bertha (1905), scrapped in 1948

== See also ==
- Bertha (disambiguation)
- Bertha (drag boat)
