= Oruçlu, Artvin =

Oruçlu
- Village
- Location within Turkey
- Coordinates: 41.101944°N 41.818333°E
- Country: Turkey
- Province: Artvin
- District: Artvin
- Population (2021): 74
- Time zone: UTC+3 (TRT)

Oruçlu is a village in the Artvin District of Artvin Province, Turkey. Its population is 74 (2021).
