= Vezirköy, Artvin =

Vezirköy
- Village
- Location within Turkey
- Coordinates: 41°13′N 41°50′E
- Country: Turkey
- Province: Artvin
- District: Artvin
- Population (2021): 244
- Time zone: UTC+3 (TRT)

Vezirköy is a village in the Artvin District of Artvin Province, Turkey. Its population is 244 (2021).
