= Ballıüzüm, Artvin =

Ballıüzüm
- Village
- Location within Turkey
- Coordinates: 41°05′N 41°48′E
- Country: Turkey
- Province: Artvin
- District: Artvin
- Population (2021): 44
- Time zone: UTC+3 (TRT)

Ballıüzüm is a village in the Artvin District, Artvin Province, Turkey. Its population is 44 (2021).
