= Köseler, Artvin =

Köseler
- Village
- Location within Turkey
- Coordinates: 41°07′26″N 41°54′46″E
- Country: Turkey
- Province: Artvin
- District: Artvin
- Population (2021): 36
- Time zone: UTC+3 (TRT)

Köseler is a village in the Artvin District of Artvin Province, Turkey. Its population is 36 (2021).
