= Kalburlu, Artvin =

Kalburlu
- Village
- Location within Turkey
- Coordinates: 41°08′N 41°53′E
- Country: Turkey
- Province: Artvin
- District: Artvin
- Population (2021): 68
- Time zone: UTC+3 (TRT)

Kalburlu is a village in the Artvin District, Artvin Province, Turkey. Its population is 68 (2021).
