= Erenler, Artvin =

Erenler
- Village
- Location within Turkey
- Coordinates: 41°16′36″N 41°47′19″E
- Country: Turkey
- Province: Artvin
- District: Artvin
- Population (2021): 222
- Time zone: UTC+3 (TRT)

Erenler is a village in the Artvin District of Artvin Province, Turkey. Its population is 222 (2021).
