= Fıstıklı, Artvin =

Fıstıklı
- Village
- Location within Turkey
- Coordinates: 41.205°N 41.794167°E
- Country: Turkey
- Province: Artvin
- District: Artvin
- Population (2021): 121
- Time zone: UTC+3 (TRT)

Fıstıklı is a village in the Artvin District of Artvin Province, Turkey. Its population is 121 (2021).
