= Elizabeth Shepard =

American politician (1899–1992)

Member of the Connecticut House of Representatives from Putnam
- In office 1957–1959 Serving with George H. Lewis Jr.
- Preceded by: Normand O. LaRose; James L. Lusby
- Succeeded by: Bertha Vadnais; Alfred C. Dion

Personal details
- Born: November 15, 1899 Boston, Massachusetts, U.S.
- Died: October 16, 1992 (aged 92) Dayville, Connecticut, U.S.
- Party: Republican

Elizabeth T. Shepard (November 15, 1899 – October 16, 1992) was an American politician who served in the Connecticut House of Representatives from 1957 to 1959, representing the town of Putnam as a Republican.
