= Zeytinlik, Artvin =

Zeytinlik
- Village
- Location within Turkey
- Coordinates: 41°7′3″N 41°51′10″E
- Country: Turkey
- Province: Artvin
- District: Artvin
- Population (2021): 46
- Time zone: UTC+3 (TRT)

Zeytinlik is a village in the Artvin District of Artvin Province, Turkey. Its population is 46 (2021).
