= Yukarımaden, Artvin =

Yukarımaden
- Village
- Location within Turkey
- Coordinates: 41°00′N 41°52′E
- Country: Turkey
- Province: Artvin
- District: Artvin
- Population (2021): 159
- Time zone: UTC+3 (TRT)

Yukarımaden is a village in the Artvin District of Artvin Province, Turkey. Its population is 159 (2021).
