= Beşağıl, Artvin =

Beşağıl
- Village
- Location within Turkey
- Coordinates: 41.2687°N 41.8115°E
- Country: Turkey
- Province: Artvin
- District: Artvin
- Population (2021): 228
- Time zone: UTC+3 (TRT)

Beşağıl is a village in the Artvin District, Artvin Province, Turkey. Its population is 228 (2021).
