= Artvin District =

District of Artvin Province, Turkey

- District
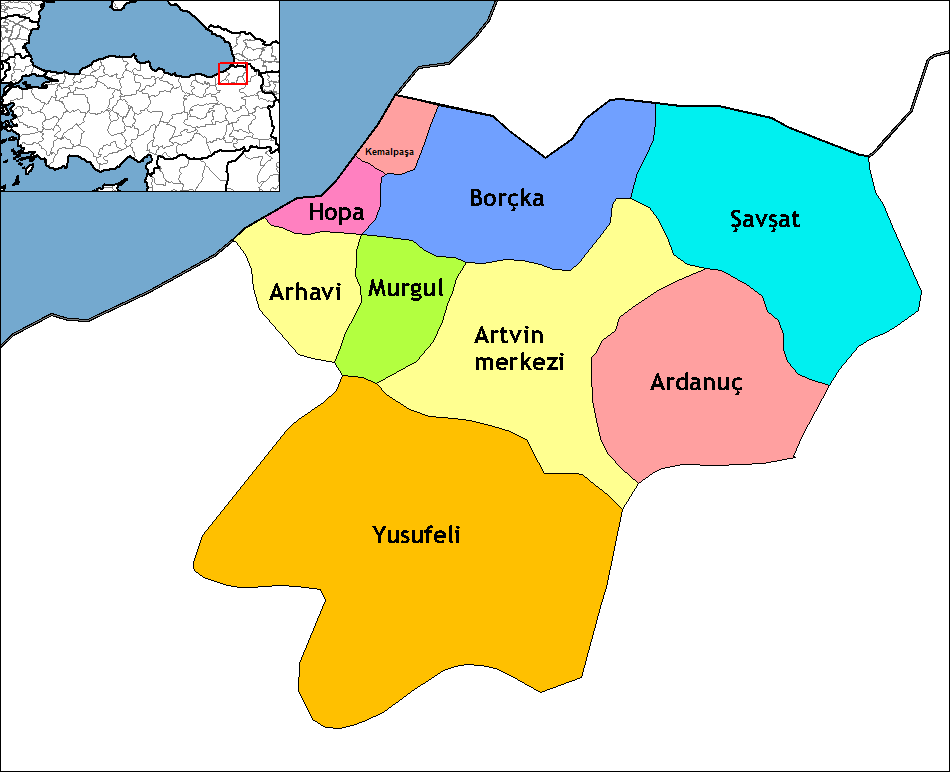
- Map showing Artvin District in Artvin Province

- Location in Turkey
- Coordinates: 41°11′N 41°49′E
- Country: Turkey
- Province: Artvin
- Seat: Artvin
- Area: 1,141 km^{2} (441 sq mi)
- Population (2021): 34,537
  - Density: 30/km^{2} (78/sq mi)
- Time zone: UTC+3 (TRT)

Artvin District (also: Merkez, meaning "central") is a district of Artvin Province of Turkey. Its seat is the town Artvin. Its area is 1,141 km^{2}, and its population is 34,537 (2021).

== Composition ==
There is one municipality in Artvin District:

- Artvin

There are 36 villages in Artvin District:

- Ağıllar
- Ahlat
- Alabalık
- Aşağımaden
- Bağcılar
- Bakırköy
- Ballıüzüm
- Beşağıl
- Çimenli
- Derinköy
- Dikmenli
- Dokuzoğul
- Erenler
- Fıstıklı
- Hamamlı
- Hızarlı
- Kalburlu
- Köseler
- Okumuşlar
- Ormanlı
- Ortaköy
- Oruçlu
- Pırnallı
- Sakalar
- Salkımlı
- Sarıbudak
- Seyitler
- Sümbüllü
- Şehitlik
- Taşlıca
- Tütüncüler
- Varlık
- Vezirköy
- Yanıklı
- Yukarımaden
- Zeytinlik
