= Hamamlı, Artvin =

Hamamlı
- Village
- Location within Turkey
- Coordinates: 41°10′08″N 41°57′13″E
- Country: Turkey
- Province: Artvin
- District: Artvin
- Population (2021): 147
- Time zone: UTC+3 (TRT)

Hamamlı is a village in the Artvin District, Artvin Province, Turkey. Its population is 147 (2021).
