= Dikmenli, Artvin =

Dikmenli
- Village
- Location within Turkey
- Coordinates: 41.046667°N 41.834167°E
- Country: Turkey
- Province: Artvin
- District: Artvin
- Population (2021): 95
- Time zone: UTC+3 (TRT)

Dikmenli is a village in the Artvin District, Artvin Province, Turkey. Its population is 95 (2021).
