= Bertrade =

Bertrade (French) or Bertrada (Latin) is a feminine given name derived from Proto-Germanic roots reconstructed as *berht ("bright") and *rād ("counsel, advice").

People named Bertrade or Bertrada include:

- Bertrada of Prüm, Frankish princess and cofounder of Prüm Abbey
- Bertrada of Laon, queen of the Franks, wife of Pippin III, and mother of Charlemagne
- Bertrade de Montfort, queen of France, wife of Fulk IV of Anjou and Philip I of France, and mother of Fulk of Jerusalem

== See also ==
- Bertha, sometimes used as a nickname for people named Bertrade
