= Seyitler =

Seyitler Süvet
- Village
- Location within Turkey
- Coordinates: 41°12′N 41°51′E
- Country: Turkey
- Province: Artvin
- District: Artvin
- Elevation: 580 m (1,900 ft)
- Population (2021): 2,367
- Time zone: UTC+3 (TRT)
- Postal code: 08100
- Area code: 0466

Seyitler is a village in the Artvin District, Artvin Province, Turkey. Its population is 2,367 (2021). It is 12 km (7.5 mi) from Artvin.

The village was founded by merging three former villages in 1925. The village was a typical cattle breeding village. But after the foundadition the Artvin Çoruh University campus near the village the main economic sector of the village shifted to services.
