= Bertha Gardiner =

Bertha Meriton Gardiner (1845–1925) was an English historian who wrote popular short books about The French Revolution and the English Civil War.

Bertha Meriton Cordery was born in Hampstead, London on 19 April 1845, the youngest daughter of John and Henrietta Cordery.

In 1875, Cordery co-authored King and Commonwealth, a history of the great rebellion with her brother-in-law James Surtees Philpotts. She researched the battlefields featured in the book herself. On 15 July 1882 she married the historian Samuel Rawson Gardiner.

As Bertha Gardiner, she wrote two books in the Epochs of English History series edited by Rev M Creighton: The Struggle Against Absolute Monarchy 1603-1688 (1877) and The French Revolution, 1789-1795 (1883). The latter was a course textbook on the subject at Syracuse University.

Gardiner also edited a collection of documents from Thomas Tanner's manuscripts about Charles I's secret negotiations in 1643 and 1644. She wrote articles for the Edinburgh Review, and was critical of John Robert Seeley's methods in a review.

Gardiner had three sons with her husband before she was widowed in 1902. She died on 5 January 1925 at the Red House, River, Dover.
