= Şehitlik, Artvin =

Şehitlik
- Village
- Location within Turkey
- Coordinates: 41.175278°N 41.84°E
- Country: Turkey
- Province: Artvin
- District: Artvin
- Population (2021): 408
- Time zone: UTC+3 (TRT)

Şehitlik is a village in the Artvin District of Artvin Province, Turkey. Its population is 408 (2021).
