= Birtha (Mesopotamia) =

Birtha (Greek: Βίρθα) was an ancient fortress on the river Tigris, which was said to have been built by Alexander the Great. It would seem, from the description of Ammianus, to have resembled a modern fortification, flanked by bastions, and with its approaches defended by out-works. Shapur II here closed his campaign in 360, and was compelled to retire with considerable loss. D'Anville and Edward Gibbon both identify Birtha as modern-day Tikrit, Iraq.

The word "Birtha" in Syriac means a castle or fortress, and might be applied to many places. From the known position of Dura, it has been inferred that the remarkable passage of the Tigris by Jovian in 363 took place near Tikrit. Towards the end of the 14th century, this impregnable fortress was stormed by Timur. The ruins of the castle are on a perpendicular cliff over the Tigris, about 200 feet (65 m) high. This insulated cliff is separated from the town by a broad and deep ditch, which was no doubt filled by the Tigris. At the foot of the castle is a large gate of brick-work, which is all that remains standing; but round the summit of the cliff the walls, buttresses, and bastions are quite traceable. There are the ruins of a vaulted secret staircase, leading down from the heart of the citadel to the water's edge.
