= Bertha, West Virginia =

Unincorporated community in West Virginia, United States

- Unincorporated community
- Location within West Virginia Location within the United States
- Coordinates: 37°34′21″N 80°52′15″W
- Country: United States
- State: West Virginia
- County: Summers
- Elevation: 1,660 ft (510 m)
- Time zone: UTC-5 (Eastern (EST))
  - Summer (DST): UTC-4 (EDT)
- Area codes: 304 & 681
- GNIS feature ID: 1553870

Bertha is an unincorporated community in Summers County, West Virginia, United States. Bertha is located on the New River, south of Hinton.
