= Bertha Koessler-Ilg =

German Argentine nurse and folklorist (1881–1965)

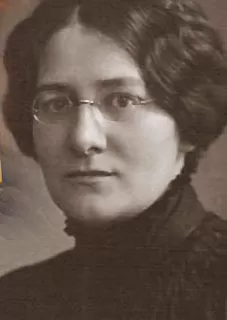
Bertha Koessler-Ilg

Bertha Koessler-Ilg (1881–1965) was a German-born Argentine nurse who is remembered for her work as a folklorist. While young, she spent some time with her uncle, the German consult of Malta, documenting the folklore of the island. In 1912, she married the physician Rudolf Kössler and emigrated with him to Argentina. There they settled in the remote Patagonian town of San Martín de los Andes where she developed friendships with the local Mapuche inhabitants. As a result, over the years she was able to record their stories and traditions. From 1940, she wrote several works in this connection, including Tradiciones araucanas (1962). This forms part of Cuenta el Pueblo Mapuche (The Mapuche People Tell Tales) published in 2006.

== Early life ==
Born in Obernzell, Bavaria, in 1881, while still young Bertha Ilg spent some time on the island of Malta together with her uncle who was the German consul. While there, she investigated the folklore and traditions of the island's original inhabitants. By 1906, she had successfully translated the tales collected by Manuel Magri into German.

After completing her training as a nurse in Frankfurt, she met and married the physician Rudolf Kössler (born 1889) from Munich. As she was not only several years younger but a Catholic while he was a Lutheran Protestant, they married well away from their parents in Genoa, Italy. In 1912, they moved to Buenos Aires and worked in the city's German hospital. In 1913, their first daughter was born and Bertha returned to Germany to show her to her parents. While there, she was surprised by World War I. As a Red Cross nurse, she was present at the Battle of Verdun. After the war was over, in 1920 she was able to return to Argentina with her daughter.

Encouraged by a compatriot who lived there, they moved to San Martin de los Andes which with 400 inhabitants was still without a doctor.

== Career ==
In addition to helping her husband and raising a family, Berta Koessler increasingly took a deep interest in the traditions of the local Mapuche population. It was not always easy for her to overcome their shyness but little by little she was able to talk with them as her friends. After listening to their stories, in the evenings she faithfully wrote them up in German, explaining many of the local expressions. Her manuscripts extended to comprehensive research into the Mapuche culture, complete with poems, songs, payers, music and children's games. A significant part of her work was published in 1962.

Unfortunately, despite her efforts, most of her work remained unpublished when she died in 1965.

Thanks to the efforts of her children, the remainder of her findings were published in Spanish in 2006.
