= Bertha Zillessen =

German artist (1872–1936)

- Born: 17 October 1872; Orsoy, German Empire
- Died: 13 January 1936 (aged 63); Bautzen, Germany
- Known for: Photography, painting
- Partner: Margarethe Karow

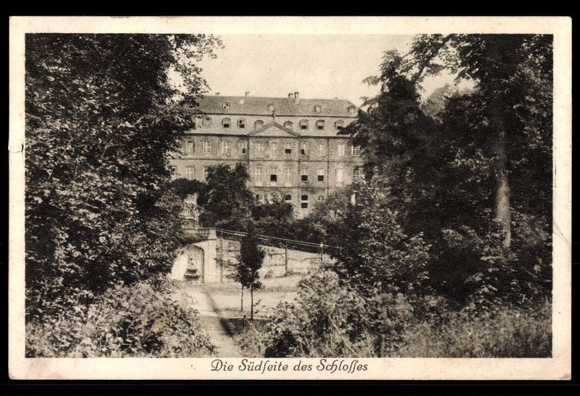
commercial postcard of Schloss Neusorge in the 1920's

Bertha Zillessen (17 October 1872 – 13 January 1936) was a German painter and photographer. She was the first professional photographer in Bautzen.

== Biography ==
Zillessen was born on 17 October 1872, in Orsoy, Germant. As a young woman, she moved to Witten and there she began learning about photography. She continued her training in Berlin and Düsseldorf where she studied with Erwin Quedenfeldt. Around 1908 she moved to Bautzen with her partner, Margarethe Karow, and the pair start a photography studio They began the commercial enterprise with portrait photography. Zillessen eventually turned to landscape photography and she became a successful postcard photographer. Her copper gravure images were published by Deutschen Heimatbilder and Saxon Heimatschutzverein. Zillessen is considered to be the first professional photographer in Bautzen.

Zillessen died on 13 January 1936, aged 63, in Bautzen. In 2019, the Museum Bautzen held a retrospective of her work.
