= Ağıllar, Artvin =

Ağıllar
- Village
- Location within Turkey
- Coordinates: 41°4′47″N 41°54′50″E
- Country: Turkey
- Province: Artvin
- District: Artvin
- Population (2021): 41
- Time zone: UTC+3 (TRT)

Ağıllar (Georgian: აგარა, romanized: agara) is a village in the Artvin District, Artvin Province, Turkey. Its population is 41 (2021).
