= Tütüncüler, Artvin =

Tütüncüler
- Village
- Location within Turkey
- Coordinates: 41.281944°N 41.738056°E
- Country: Turkey
- Province: Artvin
- District: Artvin
- Population (2021): 281
- Time zone: UTC+3 (TRT)

Tütüncüler is a village in the Artvin District of Artvin Province, Turkey. Its population is 281 (2021).
