= Alabalık, Artvin =

Alabalık
- Village
- Location within Turkey
- Coordinates: 41.2930°N 42.0725°E
- Country: Turkey
- Province: Artvin
- District: Artvin
- Population (2021): 136
- Time zone: UTC+3 (TRT)

Alabalık is a village in the Artvin District, Artvin Province, Turkey. Its population is 136 (2021).
