= Bertha Kreidmann =

Hebrew poet and letter writer, Bertha Rabbinowicz

- Born: 1848 or 1849
- Died: 16 May 1871 (aged 22); Vienna, Austria-Hungary
- Writing career
- Language: Hebrew
- Movement: Haskalah

Bertha Rabbinowicz-Kreidmann (Yiddish: בערטהא ראבינאוויטץ־קריידמאן; died 16 May 1871) was a Hebrew poet and letter writer.

Her father, Moshe Aharon Kreidmann, was an educated man from Iași who encouraged his daughter's literary pursuits. She moved to Vienna after her marriage to Baruch Rabbinowicz, who was studying medicine there. She did not live happily with her husband and fell into a depression, which ultimately led her to take her own life at the age of 22.
