= Bertha, Virginia =

- Unincorporated community
- Location within Virginia Location within the United States
- Coordinates: 36°54′8″N 80°49′42″W
- Country: United States
- State: Virginia
- County: Wythe
- Elevation: 1,939 ft (591 m)
- Time zone: UTC-5 (Eastern (EST))
  - Summer (DST): UTC-4 (EDT)
- GNIS feature ID: 1494838

Bertha is an unincorporated community in Wythe County, Virginia, United States.
