= Bartolomeo Nerici =

Italian engraver

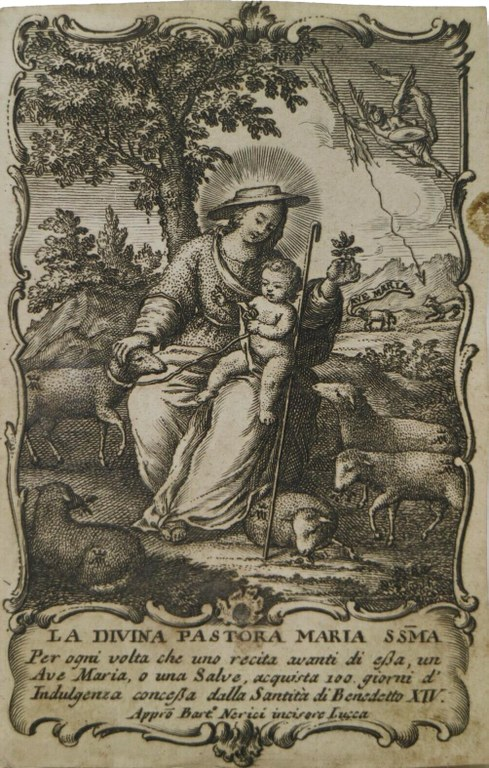
La Divina Pastora (c. 1740–1758), an etching by Bartolomeo Nerici

Bartolomeo Nerici (c. 1708 in Crasciana, Bagni di Lucca – c. 1798 in Lucca) was an Italian engraver and printmaker.

== Notable works ==
Nerici, the abott of a monastery in Lucca, established himself in the second half of the 18th century as a prolific map engraver, particularly of the Lucca region.

He is perhaps best known for submitting hundreds of plates for the Lucca edition of Encyclopédie, a set of which was purchased for 15,068 pounds of tobacco in 1785 by future United States president Thomas Jefferson, who issued orders for its protection against British general Charles Cornwallis' army.

In 1784, Nerici's engravings were published in the Livorno edition of British architect Robert Adam's 1764 magnum opus Ruins of the Palace of the Emperor Diocletian at Spalatro in Dalmatia. A folio containing twenty plates was purchased in 1875 by Croatian historian Šime Ljubić for the National Museum in Zagreb. A 1996 review of the volume by Dr. Iain Gordon Brown, then Principal Curator of Manuscripts at the National Library of Scotland, noted the "outstandingly amusing details" of Nerici's engravings.
