= Bertha Heser =

American politician (1891–1964)

Member of the Connecticut House of Representatives from Killingworth
- In office 1939–1943 Serving with John Heft Jr. (1939–1941); Peter A. Marcinek (1941–1943)
- Preceded by: J. William Steadman; William H. Sturtze
- Succeeded by: J. William Steadman; Peter A. Marcinek

Personal details
- Born: June 16, 1891 Killingworth, Connecticut, U.S.
- Died: August 25, 1964 (aged 73) Killingworth, Connecticut, U.S.
- Party: Democratic
- Spouse: Herman Heser
- Children: 1

Bertha Griswold Heser (June 16, 1891 – August 25, 1964) was an American politician who served in the Connecticut House of Representatives from 1939 to 1943, representing the town of Killingworth as a Democrat.

== Personal life ==
Heser was born on June 16, 1891, in Killingworth, Connecticut. She was married to Herman Heser, who also served as a state representative. Herman died in 1953.

== Political career ==
Heser was first elected to the Connecticut House of Representatives in 1938, and she served two terms representing the town of Killingworth as a Democrat. She served her first term alongside fellow Democrat John Heft Jr. and the second alongside Republican Peter A. Marcinek.

== Death ==
Heser died on August 25, 1964, at her home in Killingworth. She was 73.
