= Bağcılar, Artvin =

Bağcılar
- Village
- Location within Turkey
- Coordinates: 41.2250°N 42.0366°E
- Country: Turkey
- Province: Artvin
- District: Artvin
- Population (2021): 94
- Time zone: UTC+3 (TRT)

Bağcılar is a village in the Artvin District, Artvin Province, Turkey. Its population is 94 (2021).
