= Birtha (Thapsacus) =

Ancient city in Iraq

Coordinates: 35°0′N 73°40′E

Birtha (Greek: Βίρθα), was an ancient town to the southeast of Thapsacus, which Ptolemy (v. 19) places in 73° 40′ long., 35° 0′ lat. This place, the same as the Birtha of Hierocles, has been confounded by geographers with the town in Osrhoene, which lies much further to the north.
