= Sülmez Çolak =

German politician (born 1975)

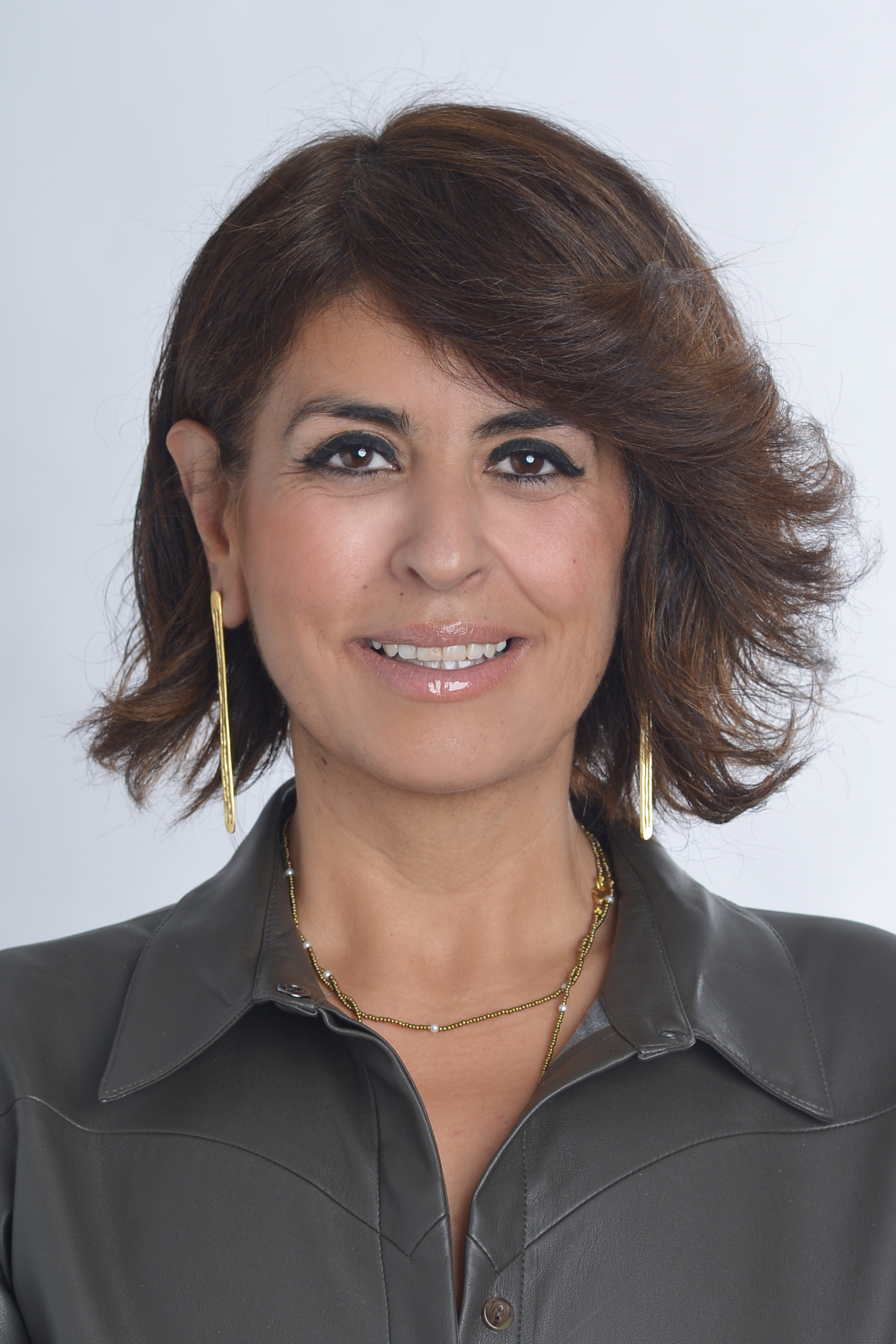
- Çolak in 2022

Member of the Bürgerschaft of Bremen
- Incumbent
- Assumed office 8 June 2011

Personal details
- Born: 11 September 1975 (age 51)
- Party: Social Democratic Party (since 2024)
- Other political affiliations: Alliance 90/The Greens (until 2024)

Sülmez Çolak (formerly Dogan; born 11 September 1975) is a German politician serving as a member of the Bürgerschaft of Bremen since 2011. From 2015 to 2023, she served as vice president of the Bürgerschaft.

== Live ==
Çolak parents were immigrants form Turkey (Gastarbeiter). she grew up in Bremerhaven. She completed her Abitur at the Lloyd-Gymnasium in Bremerhaven in 1994, subsequently studying political science, modern history, and sociology at the Technical University of Braunschweig, as well as law in Bremen. After successfully passing her first state examination in Bremen, she completed her legal traineeship (Referendariat) at the Higher Regional Court of Celle, where she passed her second state examination in 2006. She has been practicing as a lawyer in Bremerhaven since 2007.

Çolak is divorced and a mother of three children.

== Politics ==
Sülmez Çolak joined the Aliance 90/The Greens in the mid-2000s and served as a city councillor in Bremerhaven from 2007 to 2011, acting as parliamentary group leader from 2008 to 2011. Her work focused primarily on youth, women, family, and education, and she served on the corresponding committees in these areas

. Since the beginning of the 18th legislative term (2011–2015), she has been a member of the Bremen City Parliament (Bremische Bürgerschaft). Her committee assignments included the Committee for Combating and Preventing Poverty and Social Division, the Performa Nord operational committee, the Budget and Finance Committee (state level), the ad hoc committee for amending the state constitution, the Legal Affairs Committee, the Judicial Selection Committee, the Election Scrutiny Court, and the state deputation for education. She also served as the parliamentary group’s spokesperson for education and legal policy.

In 2015, she was elected Vice President of the City Parliament.

For the 2023 state election, she was nominated by her party as the lead candidate for Bremerhaven. Three days after the election, she announced her intention to resign from the Alliance 90/The Greens party. The leader of the Green parliamentary group in the Bremerhaven city council called for her to relinquish her mandate.

In May 2023, she explained to the Nordsee-Zeitung that she had become alienated from the party, arguing that the Green Party’s slogan, "We think of everyone," did not hold true. She stated that she intended to accept her seat in the City Parliament and continue the parliamentary service she has held since 2011.
