= Carl Graeb =

German painter

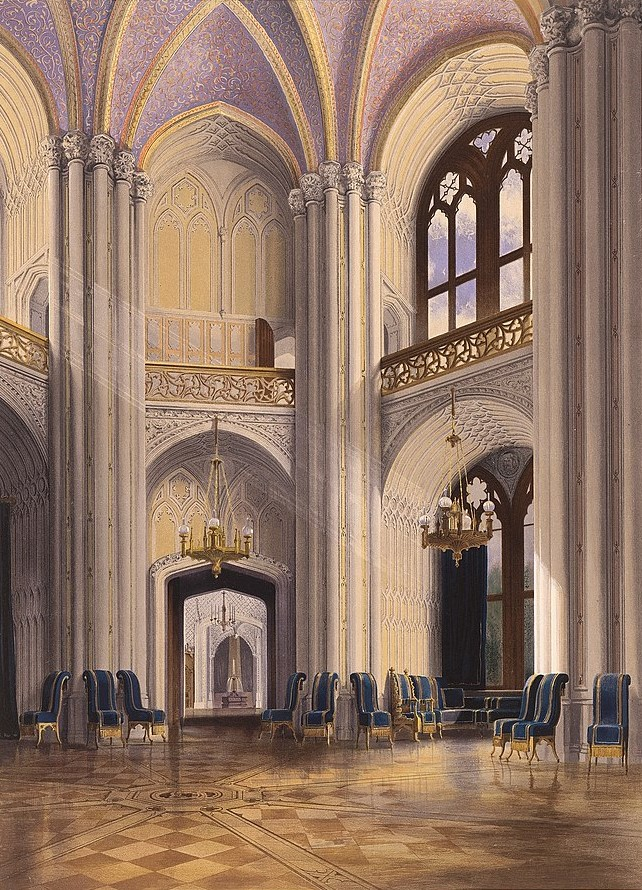
Babelsberg Palace, Dance Hall (1853)

Carl Georg Anton Graeb (18 March 1816, Berlin - 8 April 1884, Berlin) was a German architectural, decorative and theatrical scene painter. He also worked as an engraver and produced some landscapes.

== Biography ==
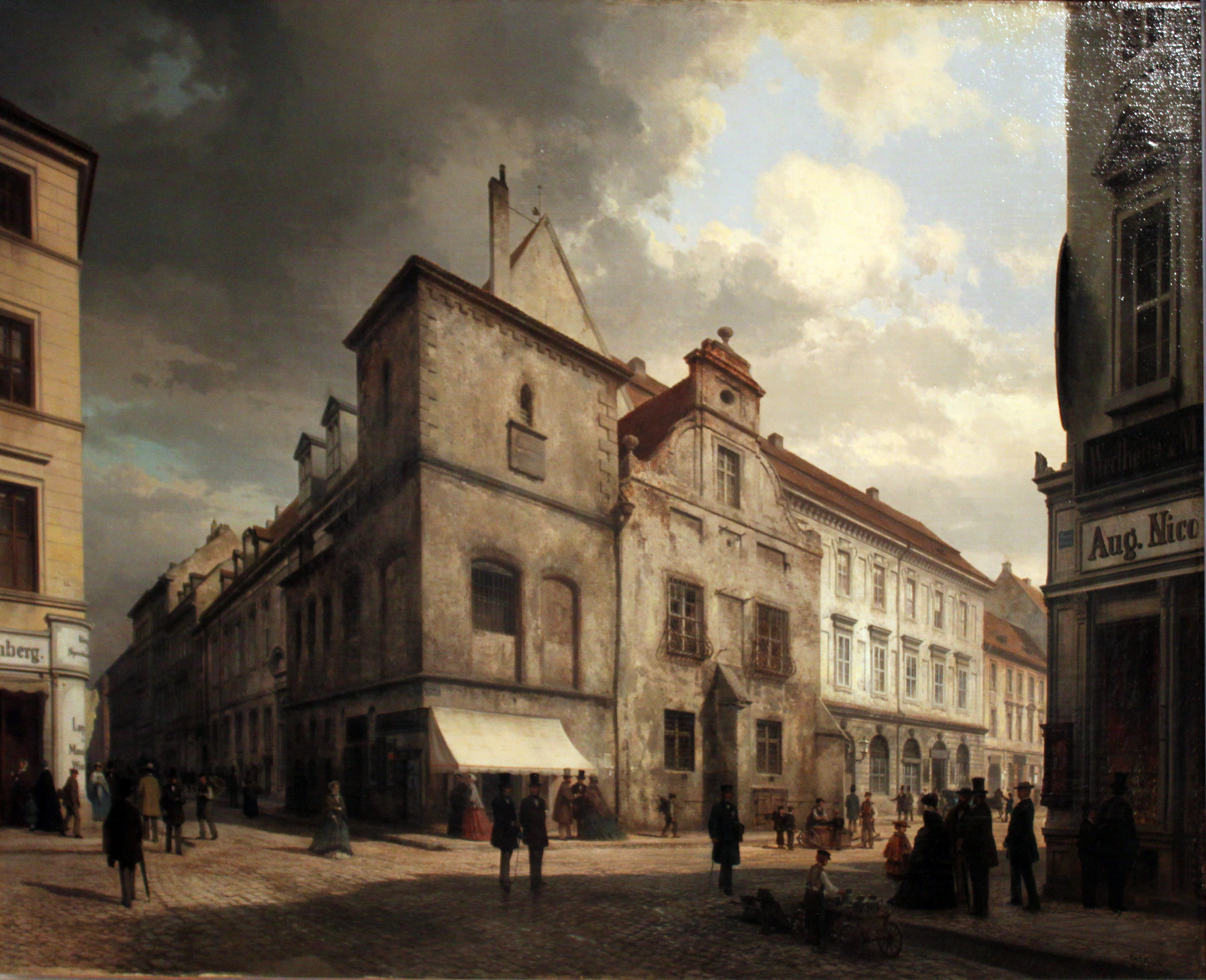
The Old Berlin Town Hall (1867)

He studied at the Prussian Academy of Arts with Carl Blechen and took private lessons from the court theater painter, and his future father-in-law, Johann Gerst. In 1838, he was hired as the theater painter for the Königsstädtisches Theater, but quit after only fourteen months to make extensive travels through Switzerland, Southern France, the Pyrenees, Italy and Sicily. His travelling continued for almost four years, during which time he would occasionally return home to exhibit the resulting works.

Upon returning permanently to Berlin in 1844, he joined with Gerst to open a decorative and theatrical painting studio, which was in operation until 1852. He ceased work as a decorative painter when he was appointed as a court painter in 1851; receiving a commission from Friedrich Wilhelm IV and his wife, Elisabeth to create 94 architectural landscapes of Potsdam and its surroundings, as well as Charlottenburg. Around the same time, he produced three murals for the Neues Museum.

In 1855, he was named a Royal Professor and, in 1860, was elected a member of the Academy of Arts. In the 1860s and 1870s, he concentrated on depicting the interiors of churches in Germany and Switzerland, A notable exception was the interior of the Old New Synagogue in Prague. He was elected to the Berlin legislature (Magistrat) in 1875 and was an honorary member of the Academy of Fine Arts, Vienna.

He died in Berlin in 1884, aged sixty-eight. His son, Paul Graeb (1842-1892) also became an architectural and landscape painter.

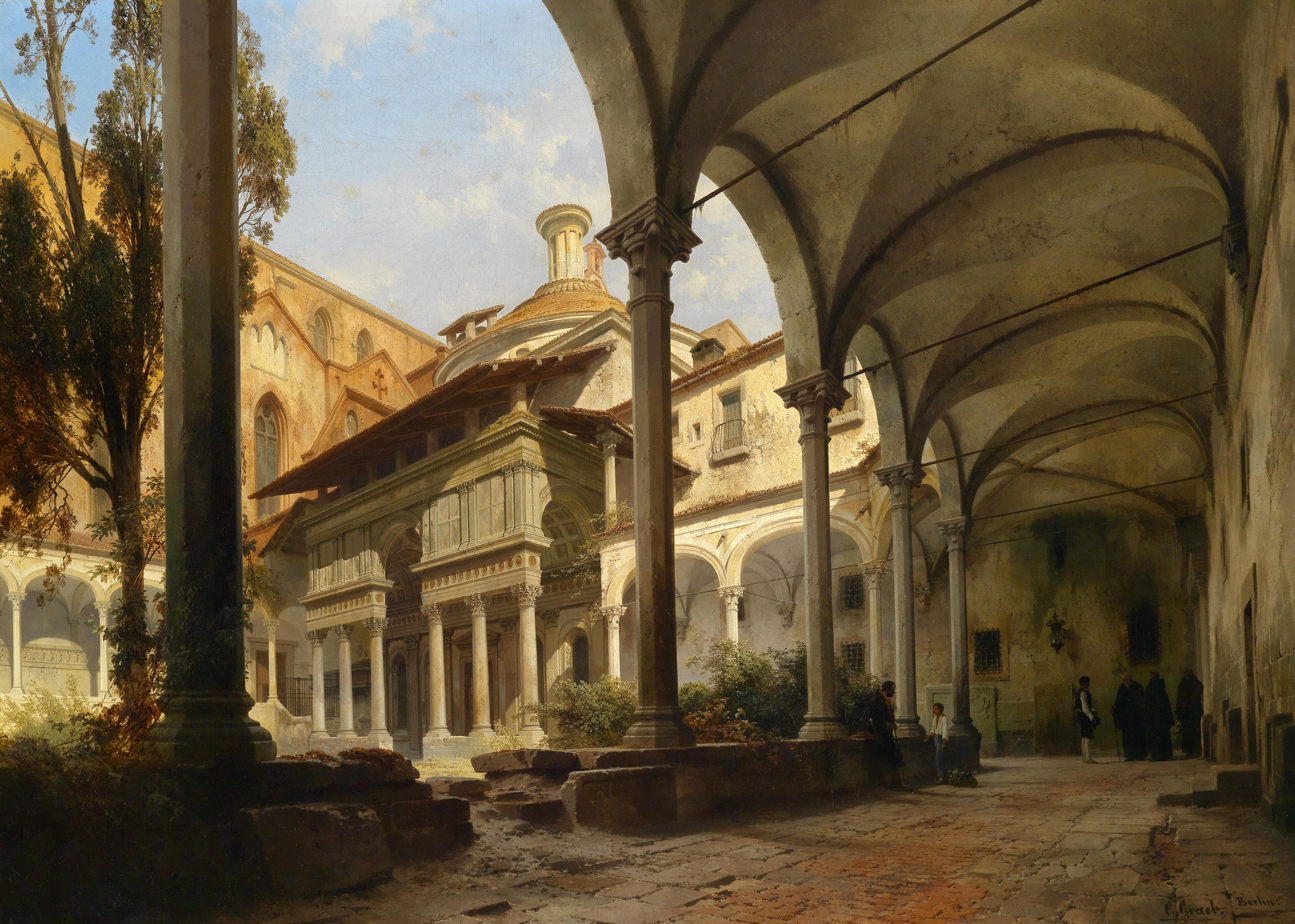
The Basilica di Santa Croce (1858)
