= Bertha Valkenburg =

Dutch artist

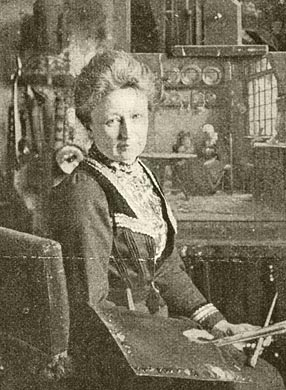
- Born: Lijmberta Aaltje Valkenburg; 5 January 1862; Almelo, Netherlands
- Died: 1 March 1929 (aged 67); Laren, North Holland, Netherlands
- Other names: Bertha Krook van Harpen-Valkenburg
- Known for: Painting

Lijmberta "Bertha" Aaltje Valkenburg (1862–1929) was a Dutch artist.

== Biography ==
Valkenburg was born on 5 January 1862 in Almelo, the daughter of painter Hendrik Valkenburg. She attended the Rijksakademie van beeldende kunsten (State Academy of Fine Arts) and the Rijksnormaalschool voor Teekenonderwijzers (National Normal School for Drawing Teachers). She studied with August Allebé. In 1910 she married Hendrik Willem Adriaan Krook van Harpen. She was a member of Arti et Amicitiae and Genootschap Kunstliefde.

Valkenburg died on 1 March 1929 in Laren, North Holland.

== Gallery ==
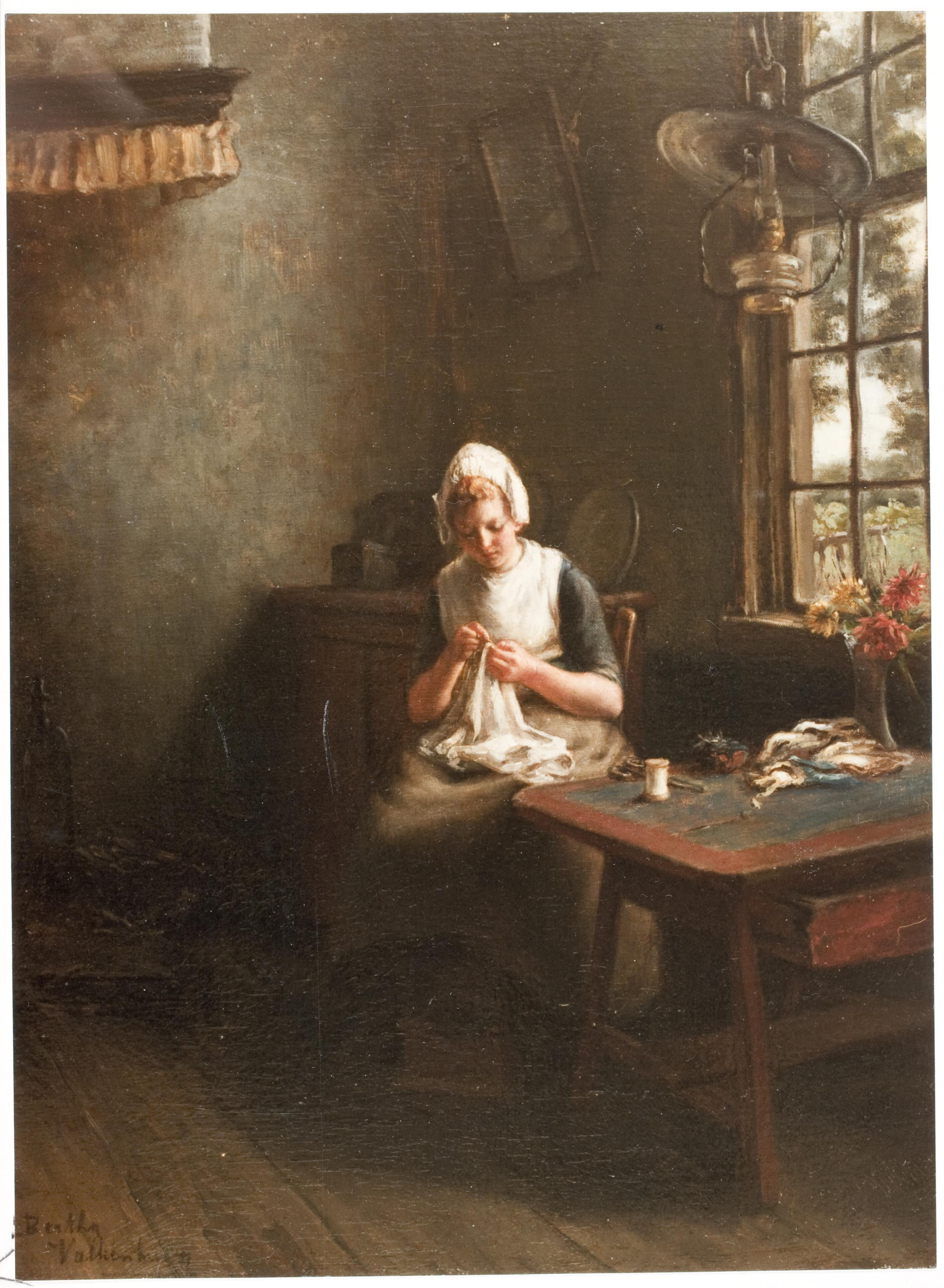
Interieur met jonge vrouw

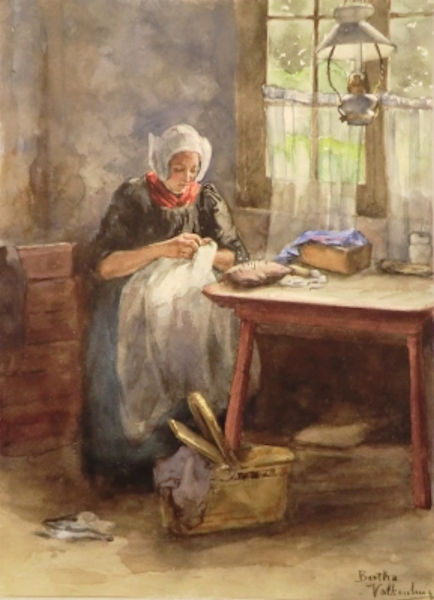
Naaister
