= Bertha Hart =

American mathematician

Bertha Irene Hart was an American mathematician. She had a Master of Arts degree from Cornell University, and was at one point an associate professor of mathematics for Western Maryland College.

== Affiliations ==
In 1946 she was elected to “ordinary membership” of the American Mathematical Society.

She was elected as a Fellow of the American Association for the Advancement of Science in 1957. At that time she was also affiliated with the Ballistic Research Laboratory.

== Notable publications ==
- “Significance Levels for the Ratio of the Mean Square Successive Difference to the Variance”, B. I. Hart, The Annals of Mathematical Statistics, Vol. 13, No. 4 (Dec., 1942), pp. 445–447
- “Tabulation of the Probabilities for the Ratio of the Mean Square Successive Difference to the Variance”, B. I. Hart, John von Neumann, The Annals of Mathematical Statistics, Vol. 13, No. 2 (Jun., 1942), pp. 207–214
- The Mean Square Successive Difference, J. von Neumann, R. H. Kent, H. R. Bellinson, B. I. Hart, The Annals of Mathematical Statistics, Vol. 12, No. 2 (Jun., 1941), pp. 153–162
