= Big Bertha =

Big Bertha is a euphonious term for an unusually large example of a class of object; notable examples include:

== Military guns ==
- Big Bertha (howitzer), a heavy mortar-like howitzer built and used by Germany during World War I
  - Paris Gun, called Big Bertha by the French, and several other big heavy German guns of World War I

== Vehicles ==
- MR 0-10-0 Lickey Banker, a large railway banking engine, especially of a 0-10-0 steam locomotive configuration
- A special version of the Vauxhall Victor automobile

== Fictional characters ==
- Big Bertha (character), a Marvel Comics superhero
- Big Bertha, an "abnormal" in the Sanctuary television series
- Big Bertha, a recurring enemy in the Mario franchise - see List of Mario franchise characters

== Other uses ==
- Big Bertha (lunar sample), the third largest lunar rock collected by the Apollo program during Apollo 14
- Bertha Heyman, a.k.a. "Big Bertha", a 19th-century criminal
- Big Bertha (cow), a cow that broke two Guinness World Records, for being both the oldest and having the most offspring
- Big Bertha (golf club), a line of golf clubs from Callaway Golf
- Big Bertha (drum), one of the world's largest bass drums
- IBM T220/T221 LCD monitors, nicknamed Big Bertha, LCD monitors with a native resolution of 3840×2400 pixels
- Bertha (tunnel boring machine), nicknamed Big Bertha, a tunnel boring machine
- La Grosse Bertha (French for "Big Bertha"), a French satirical magazine
