= Salkımlı, Artvin =

Salkımlı
- Village
- Location in Turkey
- Coordinates: 41°11′52″N 41°52′42″E
- Country: Turkey
- Province: Artvin
- District: Artvin
- Population (2021): 320
- Time zone: UTC+3 (TRT)

Salkımlı is a village in the Artvin District of Artvin Province, Turkey. Its population is 320 (2021).
