= Bertha Allen =

Women's rights advocate

Bertha Allen CM
- Born: Bertha Moses; 1934; Old Crow, Yukon, Canada
- Died: 7 May 2010 (aged 75–76); Inuvik, Northwest Territories, Canada
- Occupation: Activist
- Organization(s): International Council of Thirteen Indigenous Grandmothers; Native Women's Association of Canada; Native Women's Association of the Northwest Territories
- Children: 6

Bertha Allen CM (née Moses; 1934 – 7 May 2010) was a Vuntut Gwitchin women's rights and Indigenous rights advocate.

== Early life and education ==
Allen was born in Old Crow, Yukon, and raised by her grandparents. She was a member of the Vuntut Gwich’in Nation of Old Crow. At the age of 12, she was sent to a mission school in Aklavik, where she studied for 5 years. She attended Grant MacEwan University in Edmonton, formerly known as Grant MacEwan Community College, to take courses in life-skill coaching and leadership.

== Career ==
Allen strove to improve health services in the Northwest Territories through 10 years of volunteer work with the Territorial Hospital Insurance Services Board. For 5 years, she served as a volunteer for the Inuvik Medical Transient Centre. In 2001, she became a member of the International Council of Thirteen Indigenous Grandmothers where she served as the liaison between the elderly of the community and the Northwest Territories government of health regarding issues around wellness and social development. Bertha Allen was the founding president of the Native Women's Association of the Northwest Territories. She also served as the president of the Native Women's Association of Canada and the Advisory Council on the Status of Women in the Northwest Territories.

== Awards and accolades ==
- 1987: NWT Commissioner’s Volunteer Award, highest level
- 1987: National Health and Welfare Canadian Volunteer Award
- 1999: Governor General Award
- 2005: National Aboriginal Foundation’s Lifetime Achievement Award
- 2006: Member of the Order of Canada
- 2009: Northern medal by governor general Michael Jean

== Personal life and death ==
Bertha Allen married Victor Allen, an Inuvialuk man, and had six children.

Allen died of cancer in 2010 in Inuvik, Northwest Territories, Canada.
