= Ortaköy, Artvin =

Ortaköy Berta
- Village
- Location within Turkey
- Coordinates: 41°15′N 41°59′E
- Country: Turkey
- Province: Artvin
- District: Artvin
- Elevation: 1,020 m (3,350 ft)
- Population (2021): 988
- Time zone: UTC+3 (TRT)
- Postal code: 08100
- Area code: 0466

Ortaköy (formerly: Berta) is a village in the Artvin District, Artvin Province, Turkey. Its population is 988 (2021). Its distance to Artvin is 35 kilometres (22 mi).

== History ==
The area around Ortaköy was a part of the medieval Georgian principality of Klarjeti and housed the flourishing monastic center Berta, which was founded in the 9th century. The area fell to the eventual Ottoman conquest in the latter half of the 16th century. It was taken over by the Russian Empire in the Russo-Turkish War of 1877-1878, but reverted to the Turkish control in the aftermath of World War I. The surviving edifice of the Georgian monastery has been used as a mosque.
