= Richard Kiepert =

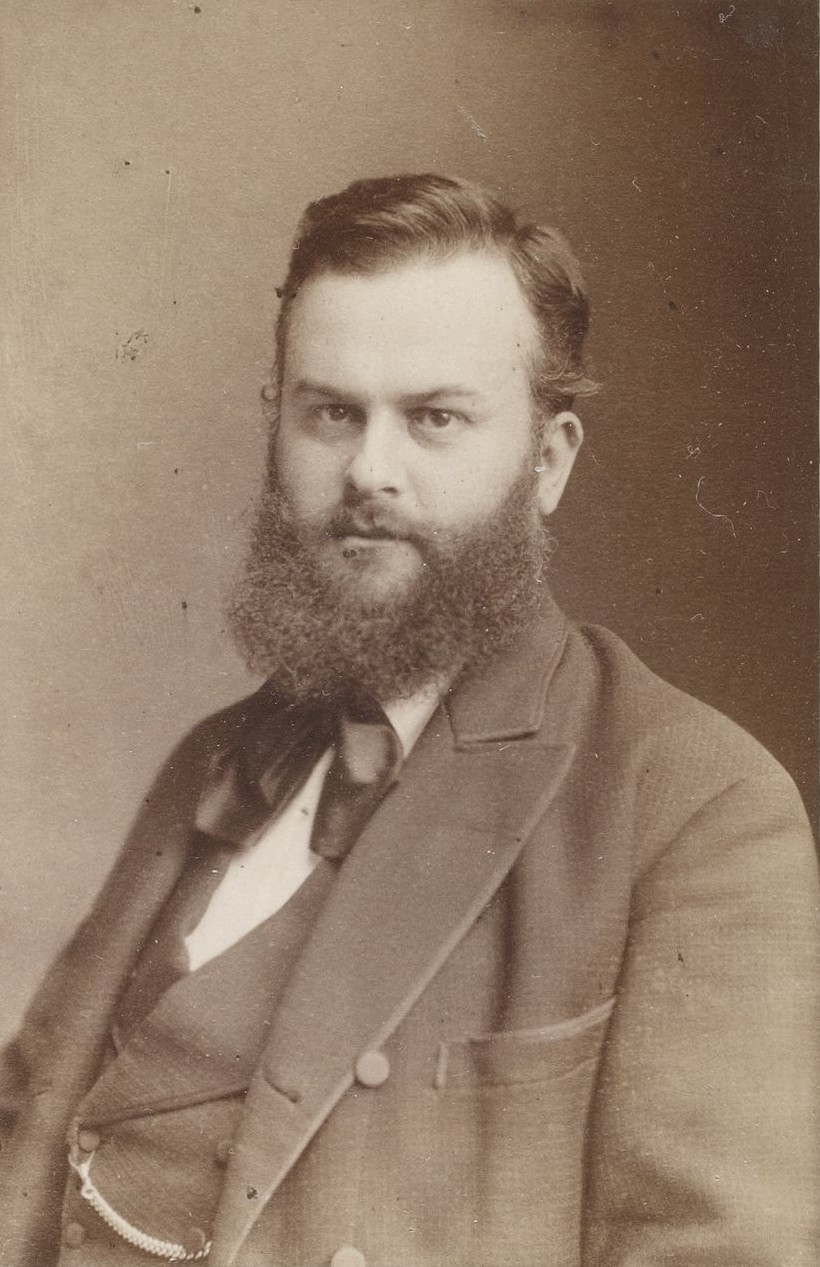
Richard Kiepert

Richard Kiepert (September 13, 1846 – August 4, 1915) was a German cartographer born in Weimar. He was the son of famed geographer Heinrich Kiepert.

== Biography ==
Richard Kiepert studied geography and history in Berlin and Heidelberg. In 1870, he traveled in Palestine and Asia Minor, returning to take part in the Franco-Prussian War. In 1874, he received his doctorate of philosophy at the University of Jena.

Kiepert prepared maps from data amassed by German explorers of Africa that included Friedrich Gerhard Rohlfs (1831–1896) and Heinrich Barth (1821–1865). Two important African geographic works of his were Deutscher Kolonialatlas and Spezialkarte von Deutsch-Ostafrika.

From 1874 until 1878 he worked on the compilation of Ferdinand von Richthofen's atlas of China, and from 1875 to 1887, he was editor of the geographical periodical Globus. From 1902 until 1908 he worked on the Spezialkarte von Kleinasien, a map of Asia Minor that was created on a 1:400,000 scale. After his father's death in 1899, he continued the work on the elder Kiepert's classic Formae Orbis Antiqui.

In 1908 Kiepert was the recipient of the Carl Ritter Medal of the Geographical Society of Berlin, and in 1913 was given the honorary title of professor.
