= Berta monastery =

Former Georgian Orthodox monastery in Ortaköy, Artvin, Turkey

Coordinates: 41.249°N 41.983°E

The Berta monastery (Georgian: ბერთა, Turkish: Berta Manastırı) is a former Georgian Orthodox monastery at the village of Ortaköy (formerly Berta), Artvin Province, Turkey. It was built in the 8th or 9th century. The surviving structure is now used as a mosque.

== History ==
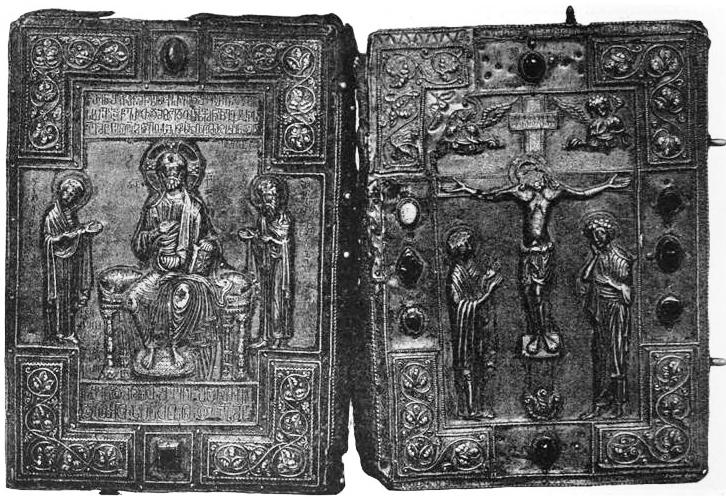
A chased book cover of the 12th-century Berta Gospels.

The Monastery of the Mother of God in Berta or Bertay is first mentioned by the 10th-century Georgian author Giorgi Merchule as a part of Georgian monastic communities operating under the guidance of Grigol of Khandzta (759–861) in what then was the Georgian Bagratid principality of Klarjeti. The monastery sat on a hill overlooking what is now the village of Ortaköy and consisted of several structures, of which the main church was a domed structure faced with smoothly finished small blocks. After the Ottoman takeover of the area in the 16th century, the church was abandoned. In the 19th century, the remaining edifice was converted into a mosque and a minaret was added to it. The ruins of a large rectangular refectory have survived to the north of the former church.

== Berta manuscripts ==
The monastery also functioned as a center for literary activities. Two important Georgian manuscripts known as the Berta Gospels have survived. One, dating from 988, is held at Houghton Library in Cambridge, Massachusetts (MS Georgian 1), where it is on deposit from the American Board of Commissioners for Foreign Missions. The other (Q-906) dates from the 12th century and is kept at the National Center for Manuscripts in Tbilisi, Georgia; its gilded book-cover is attributed to the 12th-century master Beshken of Opiza.
