= Okumuşlar, Artvin =

Okumuşlar
- Village
- Location within Turkey
- Coordinates: 41°06′03″N 41°55′15″E
- Country: Turkey
- Province: Artvin
- District: Artvin
- Population (2021): 20
- Time zone: UTC+3 (TRT)

Okumuşlar is a village located in the Artvin District of Artvin Province, Turkey. Its population is 20 (2021).
