= Bertha Edwards =

American librarian (1920–2009)

- Born: Bertha Mae Edwards
- Other name: Mrs. George Isiah Edwards

Bertha Mae Winborne Edwards (1920–2009), was the librarian of Portsmouth (Virginia) Colored Community Library for its entire existence, 1945–1963, moving to the integrated Portsmouth Public Library in 1963 as part of an integrated staff. She is also known for her writings on the history of Blacks in Portsmouth, Virginia.

== Early life ==
Edwards was born on June 8, 1920 in Portsmouth, Virginia. She graduated in 1942 from Hampton Institute where she majored in social studies and library science. After graduation she worked first at the Naval Supply Depot and then was a kindergarten teacher at the Zion Baptist Church from 1944 until 1945.

== Career ==
Edwards was hired by the City of Portsmouth to serve as librarian at the 900 square foot brick building beginning in 1945. She formed the library into a community resource, successfully making the case to city officials that because Black people made up one third of the Portsmouth population at the time, her library should receive one third of the funding supplied to the Whites-only library. Although the Portsmouth Public Library had a Whites-only policy prior to 1960, the Colored Community Library welcomed people of all races. The White librarian at Portsmouth Public Library collaborated with Edwards while the two libraries were segregated, sometimes ordering duplicate copies of reference books and giving one to Edwards for the "Colored" library. As an exchange, Edwards shared her collection of Portsmouth Black history documents. As of 2013, this scrapbook is considered an endangered artifact.

In 1960 a judge ordered the Whites-only Portsmouth Public Library to desegregate. In 1963, the library moved into larger quarters in a remodeled post office with an integrated staff and library board. Edwards became part of the staff at the integrated library. In 1960 the state of Virginia began to require licenses for librarians, and retroactively conferred them on staff currently serving as library directors except for Edwards, apparently due to her race.

Edwards was also a historian and archivist, and collected documentation of Black history and Black community members of Portsmouth. She wrote several books including books on the history of blacks in Portsmouth, Virginia, photos of blacks in the area, and a history of black baseball in Portsmouth.

== Awards and honors ==
In 1997, Edwards received the "Excellence in Librarianship Award". In 2015, the American Library Association dedicated the Portsmouth Community Library and Edwards as a literary landmark.
