= Bertha Moraes Nérici =

Brazilian nurse (1921–2005)

- Born: 2 November 1921; Santana de Parnaíba
- Died: 14 June 2005; Santana de Parnaíba
- Occupation: Nurse

Bertha Moraes Nérici (2 November 1921 – 14 June 2005) was a Brazilian nurse, born in Santana de Parnaíba who served in Italy during World War II.

Nérici is notable for being the first woman to serve in the Brazilian Expeditionary Force Nursing Corps during World War II. In this sense, Nérici was part of the first female group in the Brazilian Army.

On August 4, 1944, she embarked for Naples, returning to Brazil on October 3, 1945, on the James Parker ship. During her time on the Italian front, Nérici served in several blood hospitals of the United States Army.

For her services, she was promoted to the rank of 1st Captain, being awarded the Medalha de Guerra and the Medalha de Campanha.
