= Derinköy, Artvin =

Derinköy
- Village
- Location within Turkey
- Coordinates: 41°05′N 41°52′E
- Country: Turkey
- Province: Artvin
- District: Artvin
- Population (2021): 36
- Time zone: UTC+3 (TRT)

Derinköy is a village in the Artvin District, Artvin Province, Turkey. Its population is 36 (2021).
