= Bertha Vadnais =

American politician (died 1973)

Member of the Connecticut House of Representatives from Putnam
- In office 1959–1967 Serving with Alfred C. Dion
- Preceded by: George H. Lewis Jr. Elizabeth Shepard
- Succeeded by: Seat eliminated

Personal details
- Born: Bertha Pigeon; 1900 or 1901
- Died: March 30, 1973 (aged 72) Putnam, Connecticut, U.S.
- Party: Democratic
- Spouse: Henry A. Vadnais
- Children: 2

Bertha Vadnais (1900 or 1901 – March 30, 1973) was an American politician who served in the Connecticut House of Representatives from 1959 to 1967, representing the town of Putnam as a Democrat.

== Political career ==
Vadnais was elected to the Connecticut House of Representatives in 1958 as one of two representatives from the town of Putnam. She served alongside fellow Democrat Alfred C. Dion. Though Vadnais was formally elected to only two terms, she remained in her seat until January 1967 due to Connecticut's 1964 redistricting attempts. Following the court decision Butterworth V. Dempsey, Connecticut's apportionment was ruled unconstitutional, and the state was federally mandated to redistrict. When the General Assembly failed to do so in time, Connecticut was ordered to cancel its 1964 House election, and the legislature elected in 1962 was ultimately held over until 1967 due to a lengthy impasse. Vadnais and Dion had no successors as the redistricting ended the use of single-town districts.

=== Tenure ===
In 1963, Vadnais opposed the closing of a New Haven Railroad station in Putnam, which the railroad said was intended to decrease maintenance costs. She argued that the station was still in use and the city funded the janitor service. The railroad subsequently agreed to remove the station from its list of 17 stations slated to close.

In 1965, Vadnais opposed the repeal of a law which prohibited the dissemination of information on birth control. She credited her opposition to her belief in God, particularly in the mandate "go forth and multiply".

== Personal life ==
Vadnais was married to Henry A. Vadnais, with whom she had two children, Theresa and Henry Jr.

== Death ==
Vadnais died of a heart attack on March 30, 1973, at age 72. At the time of her death, she was attending a dinner sponsored by the Putnam Democratic Town Committee in honor of herself and several other guests. Shortly after delivering an award acceptance speech, Vadnais collapsed and was taken to Day Kimball Hospital, where she was pronounced dead on arrival.
