= Bertha Heyman =

Prussian-born American conwoman

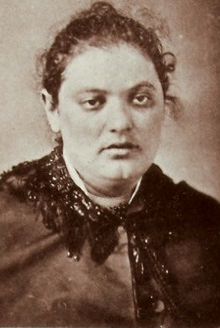
- Heyman in June 1881
- Born: Bertha Schlesinger c. 1851; Prussia
- Died: April 26th 1901; Chicago, Illinois
- Other names: Big Bertha; Confidence Queen
- Occupation: Criminal
- Spouse(s): Fritz Karko; John Heyman

Bertha Heyman (born c. 1851 - 1901) was an American criminal, also known as "Big Bertha" or the "Confidence Queen." She was described by famed New York City detective Thomas F. Byrnes as "one of the smartest confidence women in America", and was considered by the New York City police to be "the boldest and most expert of the many female adventuresses who infest the country." She managed to swindle several men out of a total of many thousands of dollars, even while behind bars.

== Background, description, and criminal methodology ==
She was born Bertha Schlesinger in Prussia, and came to the United States in 1878. She was married twice; first to Fritz Karko, with whom she lived in New York and later Milwaukee; and then to a man she identified as John Heyman. Contemporary sources described her as "a stout gross looking woman", or alternatively as having a "somewhat pleasing face" or "a lady of the same smart appearance and engaging manners." Byrnes profiled her in his 1886 book Professional Criminals of America, and described her as follows:

Thirty-five years old in 1886. Born in Germany. Married. Very stout woman. Height, 5 feet 4½ inches. Weight, 245 pounds. Hair brown, eyes brown, fair complexion. German face. An excellent talker. Has four moles on her right cheek.

Heyman's typical scheme involved conning money out of men by pretending to be a wealthy woman who was unable to access her fortune. She stayed at the best hotels and retained both a maid and a manservant in her service, while bragging about having influential friends. Her confidence tricks "were extraordinarily bold and ingenious, and they were covered by much ostentatious display."

Heyman told The New York Times in 1883 that she was only interested in getting money, not in having or spending it, and claimed that she gave the bulk of her ill-gotten funds to the poor. "The moment I discover a man's a fool I let him drop, but I delight in getting into the confidence and pockets of men who think they can't be 'skinned.' It ministers to my intellectual pride."

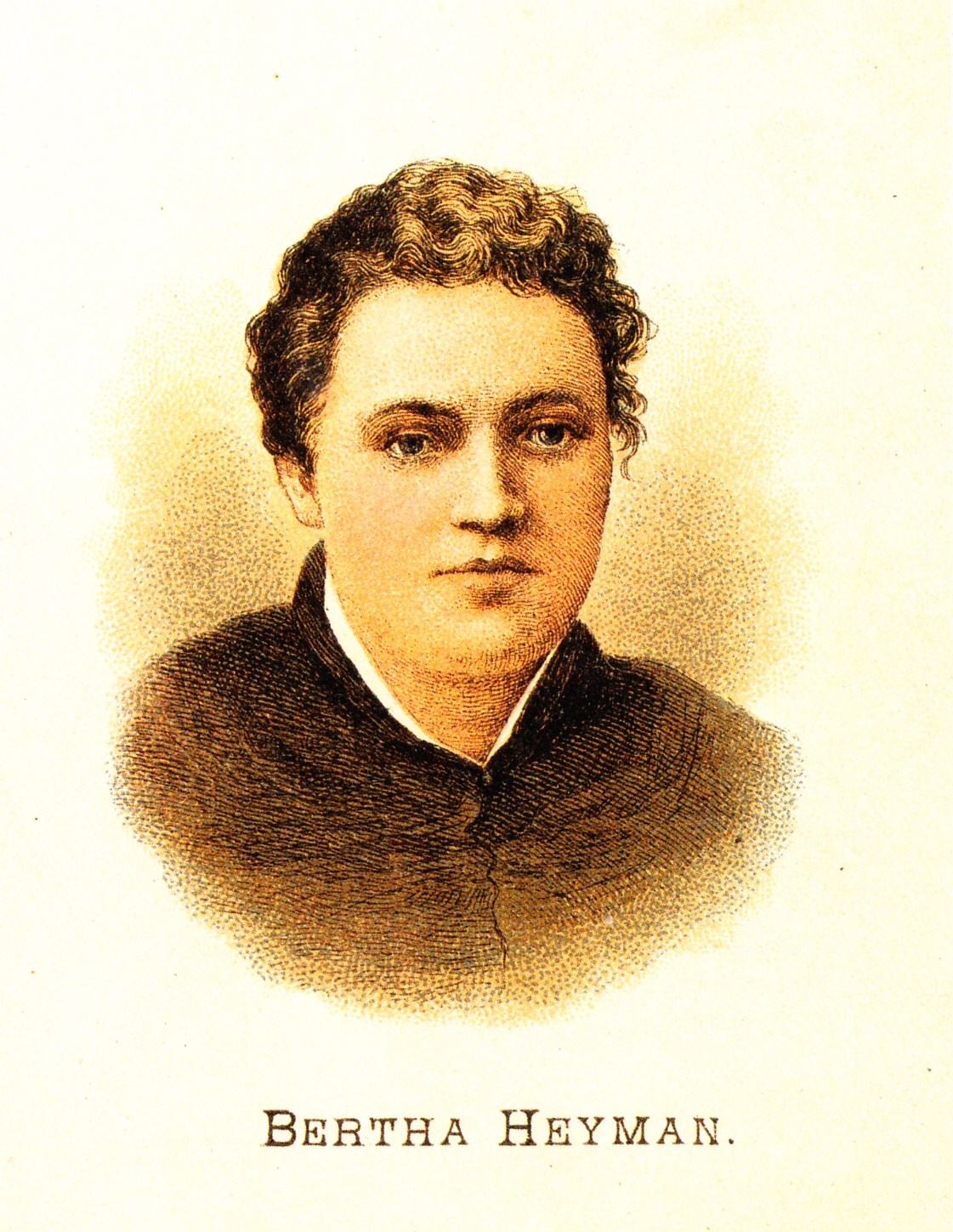
Heyman depicted on an 1888 cigarette card

== Crimes and arrests ==
Heyman was arrested and jailed numerous times over the course of her criminal career. She was arrested in September 1880 for conning a sleeping car conductor she had met while on a train from Chicago. Heyman had told him she had a large estate she wanted him to manage, and he quit his job on her promise to hire him. Heyman then told him she needed to borrow some money to obtain the sum that was due to her from her agent, and furthered the deception by taking him to a large house she claimed to own, as evidence of her wealth.

Heyman was soon arrested again in London, Ontario on February 8, 1881, charged with swindling several hundred dollars from a Montreal businessman. She stood trial in June 1881 for stealing $250 and two gold watches from an elderly woman she boarded with in Staten Island, but was acquitted. She was arrested again while leaving the court, this time for conning two New York City businessmen out of a total of $1460. She was convicted on one of the indictments and sentenced on October 29, 1881 to two years in prison. While serving time in prison on Blackwell's Island, she managed to befriend a man and con him out of his life savings of $900 (the equivalent of $20,700 in 2011 dollars).

As part of a scam on her own attorney, she once claimed to be worth $20 million. She also defrauded a Wall Street broker who she had convinced she was worth $8 million, with forged securities. For this crime, she was again convicted in the Court of General Sessions, on August 22, 1883, and sentenced to five years in prison.

Heyman died on April 26, 1901, in Chicago, Illinois.
